This is a list of Member of the Order of the British Empire (MBE) awards in the 1919 Birthday Honours.

The 1919 Birthday Honours were appointments by King George V to various orders and honours to reward and highlight good works by citizens of the British Empire. The appointments were made to celebrate the official birthday of The King, and were published in The London Gazette from 3 June to 12 August. The vast majority of the awards were related to the recently ended War, and were divided by military campaigns. A supplementary list of honours, retroactive to the King's birthday, was released in December 1919.

Member of the Order of the British Empire (MBE) awards

Military Division

For valuable services rendered in connection with military operations in the Aden Peninsula — 
Temp Lt. Norman Willis Clayton  
Lt. Geoffrey Morton Eden, Royal Army Service Corps

For valuable services rendered in connection with military operations in the Balkans — 
Lt. Cyril John Andrewes, Royal Army Service Corps
Lt. Eric Clement Barker, Shropshire Light Infantry
Lt. John Percival Barker, Royal Field Artillery
Temp Lt. Graeme Morrison Black, Royal Scots Fusiliers
Lt. George Shearsley Blake, North Staffordshire Regiment
Lt. Joshua Rupert Ingham Brooke, Royal Garrison Artillery
Lt. Frederick Arthur Brough, Royal Field Artillery
Lt. Herbert Browning, Hampshire Regiment
Lt. Ian Robert Cranford George Mary Bruce, Q.O., Cameron Highlanders
Lt. Hugh Alan Bruno Bruno, Hampshire Regiment
Temp Lt. Bernard Temple Cadoux
Temp Lt. Frederick Christian Charnand
Lt. Lowthianr Hume Chidson, East Surrey Regiment
Lt. Harold Frederick Cree, East Kent Regiment
Lt. Reginald Francis Dew, Royal Engineers
Temp Lt. Artihur William East
Temp Lt. Henry William Erby, Royal Army Ordnance Corps
Lt. Richard Philip Hastings Eyre, Royal Army Service Corps
Temp Lt. Henry Robert Faulkner, East Surrey Regiment
Lt. Henry Barry Fetherston  Royal Field Artillery
Temp Lt. Edward Seymour Foster
Lt. Thomas Lawrence Fox, Royal Army Service Corps
Lt. George Herbert Freeman, Royal Garrison Artillery
Lt. Brian Berkeley Gattie, Royal Army Service Corps
Temp Lt. Ernest Edward Goate, Royal Engineers
Lt. James Stanley Peel Godsell
Temp Lt. Evelyn Rudolf Albert John Gout
Temp Quartermaster and Lt. John Richard Gower, Welsh Regiment
Lt. Robert Wallace Greenlees, Royal Garrison Artillery
Lt. Arthur Charles Hext, E. Riding Yeomanry
Lt. Preston Horan, Durham Light Infantry
Temp Lt. Harold Allan Dilke Hoyland
Lt. Roland Cecil Hudson, Scottish Horse Yeomanry
Temp 2nd Lt. Hubert John Humphries, Oxfordshire and Buckinghamshire Light Infantry
Lt. Archie William Ibbotson  Indian Army Reserve of Officers
Temp Lt. John Jardine, Royal Engineers
Temp Lt. Vincent Raymond Kenny, Royal Engineers
Lt. Malcolm King, Argyll and Sutherland Highlanders
Quartermaster and Temp Lt. Alfred James Knight, Duke of Cornwall's Light Infantry
Lt. Harold Edward Kitching, Durham Light Infantry
Lt. Edward Leonard La Fontaine
Lt. Roger Uredale Lambert, Royal Field Artillery
Lt. William John Luxton
Temp Lt. Henry Charles Gordon McCormick, Royal Army Service Corps
Lt. Niel Boyd Watson McEacharn, King's Own Scottish Borderers
Lt. Edward Robert Mileson MacGuire, Middlesex Regiment
Lt. Harrison Martin, Royal Field Artillery
Lt. John Francis Ralph Massy-Westropp, Royal Irish Fusiliers
Lt. Ernest Francis K. Matthews, Shropshire Light Infantry
Lt. Ernest Middleton, Royal Field Artillery
Lt. Joseph Charles Miller, Royal Army Ordnance Corps
Lt. George Ash Minter, Royal Army Service Corps
Temp 2nd Lt. Archibald John Morris, S.W. Bords
Lt. Ramsay Llewellyn Ives Nares
Lt. Crawford Noble, Suffolk Yeomanry
Lt. William Francis Vaughan Parry
Lt. Thomas Partington, Royal Army Service Corps
2nd Lt. James Perkins, Royal Engineers
Lt. Harold Oldham Rose, Royal Engineers
Lt. Harry Francis Saunders
Temp Lt. George Henry Gould Smith
Lt. Matthew Garvan Steele, Royal Field Artillery
Capt. John Stirling, Lovais Scouts
Lt. Charles John Strachan, Royal Sussex Regiment
Lt. Thomas Angus Swan
Temp Lt. Hugh Oddin Taylor, Royal Army Service Corps
2nd Lt. Kenneth John Thomson, Royal Engineers
Temp Lt. Henry Gordon Tomson, Suffolk Regiment
Lt. David Alexander Weir, East Surrey Regiment
Lt. Charles Clement Stuart White, Royal Engineers
Lt. John Dane Woodall  Royal Artillery

For valuable services rendered in connection with military operations in East Africa— 
Lt. Alfred Thomas Duncan Anderson, Indian Army Reserve of Officers
Temp Capt. Howard Wolfenden Armstrong
Capt. Charles Matthew Baker, Labour Corps, East African Forces
2nd Lt. Alexander Black, Royal Engineers
Temp Capt. George Guy Butler, Royal Army Medical Corps
Capt. Edward Redvers Kerrington Collins, Labour Corps, East African Forces
Temp Capt. Andrew Crawford, Royal Army Medical Corps
Capt. Walter Doble, Labour Corps, East African Forces
Temp Capt. George Windham Wright Evans
Rev Joseph Fillion, Royal Army Chaplains' Department
Capt. Walter Graham, Labour Corps, East African Forces
Capt. John Isdale Greig  Royal Army Medical Corps
Rev Robert Hack, Royal Army Chaplains' Department
Lt. Robert Innes, Labour Corps, East African Forces
Capt. Arthur Fitzherbert King-Magee, East African Forces
Lt. Frederick Loveridge, East African Forces
Rev John Bernard McCormack, Labour Corps, East African Forces
Temp 2nd Lt. William Samuel Maddams, Royal Engineers, East African Forces
Quartermaster and Capt. George. William Martin, Royal Army Service Corps
Quartermaster and Temp Lt. Andrew Michie, King's African Rifles
Temp Capt. Henry Felix Mullan, Royal Army Medical Corps
Lt. Joseph (Prince) Mussanji Walugembe, African National Medical Corps
Temp Lt. William Maxwell Nightingale
Temp Capt. Frederick Cecil Pheysey, Royal Army Service Corps
Temp Capt. Edward John Joseph Quirk, West African Medical Service
Hon Lt. William Sydney Rapley, Royal Engineers
Quartermaster and Capt. James Sin Robertson, East African Medical Service
Temp Lt. Veral Glen Robins, Royal Engineers
Temp Lt. Frederick Saunders, Royal Engineers
Quartermaster and Capt. Robert Stanley, East African Medical Service
Capt. Ernest Elliot Stock, East African Forces
Temp Lt. William Joseph Suffield, King's African Rifles
Lt. Johri Unger, East African Forces
Temp Lt. Charles Ernest Ufquhart, Royal Army Ordnance Corps
Lt. Frank Watkins, East African Forces
Temp Capt. Harold Braithwait Whitaker, Royal Engineers
Temp Capt. James Bowman Wilkie  Royal Army Medical Corps

South African Forces
Temp Lt. Herbert James Beatty
Temp Capt. Frank Haart Bowen, SA Special Service
Temp Capt. John Brown, Rhodesian Forces
Temp Capt. Robert Edward Clegg, SA Service Corps
Rev Hugh Frederick De Lisle, SA Chaplains' Department
Capt. Robert Douglas Argyll Douglas  SA Medical Corps
Temp Lt. David Fraser, SA Service Corps
Lt. Vickefy Hamilton, SA Service Corps
Temp Capt. James Osier Henrey, SA Motor Cyclist Cps
Temp Lt. Walter John Houghton, SA Motor Cyclist Cps
Temp Capt. Hugh Hendrick Christein Ahrens Lance, SA Special Service
Capt. Stuart Mackintosh McPherson, SA Medical Corps
Temp Capt.William Alfred Manseth, SA Service Corps
Temp Capt. Rupert James Hartwell Pattle, SA Service Corps
Lt. Fulham Turner, SA Water Supply Corps
Temp Capt. William Watson, SA  Special Service

For valuable services rendered in connection with military operations in German South West Africa —
Lt. Arthur William Collett, Hunt's Scouts
Lt. Charles Newbald Smith, Hunt's Scouts

For valuable service rendered in connection with military operations in France —
Temp Lt. Frank Adcock, Royal Engineers
Temp 2nd Lt. William Allan, Royal Army Service Corps
Temp Lt. Gerald Owrlyle Allingham, Royal Engineers
Temp Lt. John Henry Arundel, Royal Engineers
Temp 2nd Lt. Walter Cleveland Armitage, Royal Army Service Corps
Staff Sergant M. Charles Henry Atkins, Royal Army Service Corps
Lt. Ernest Atteniborougih, Royal Engineers
Lt. John Joseph Bannon
Lt. Edwin Ernest Barnett, Northumberland Hussars
Lt. William Sooley Battle, Royal Army Service Corps
Lt. Arthur James Beer, London Regiment
Alice Mary Bennett, Unit Administrator, Queen Mary's Army Auxiliary Corps
Staff Sergeant Maj. Marmaduke Bevan, Royal Army Service Corps
Temp Lt. Arthur Grimwade Bishop, Worcestershire Regiment
Temp Lt. Edgar Derwenit Blackwood, Royal Engineers
Temp Lt. Arthur Blair-White, Royal Field Artillery
Lt. George Sebastian Bleck, Lothians and Border Horse
2nd Lt. Cyril Henry Charles Bond, Royal Army Service Corps
Temp Lt. Stanley Hunt Brand, Royal Army Service Corps
Sub. Condtr. William Thomas Brewster, Royal Army Ordnance Corps
Temp Quartermaster and Lt. Ernest Gottlieb Isdeal Brice, Royal Army Medical Corps
Temp 2nd Lt. George Wauchop Stewart Brown, Rifle Brigade
Phillis Warden Brown, Unit Administrator, Queen Mary's Army Auxiliary Corps
Temp Lt. Godfrey Middleton Eric Bryan, Royal Army Service Corps
Lt. Thomas Edward Bryan, Royal Berkshire Regiment
Lt. Hugh Edward Bullivant, Royal Field Artillery
Lt. Walter Beresford Bulteel, Scottish Horse
Thomas Frederick Busby, Royal Engineers
Norah Evelyn Cable, Unit Administrator, Queen Mary's Army Auxiliary Corps
Temp Quartermaster and Lt. Donald George Campbell, Somerset Light Infantry
Lt. John Campbell, Royal Engineers
Sergeant Maj. Albert John Carey, Royal Army Service Corps
Hattie Maud Carey, Unit Administrator, Queen Mary's Army Auxiliary Corps
Lt. Rupert Tristran Oliver Gary, Middlesex Regiment
Staff Sergeant Maj. John William Carr, Royal Army Service Corps
Lt. Morden Archibald Carthew-Yorstoun, Royal Highlanders
Superintendent Clerk Sydney Challice, West Yorkshire Regiment
Temp Lt. Martin Harry Clark, Royal Army Service Corps
Quartermaster Sergeant Ernest Herbert Clarke, Royal Army Medical Corps
Staff Quartermaster Sergeant Fred Wainwright Claye, Royal Army Service Corps
Staff Quartermaster Sergeant Herbert Edmund Clegg, Royal Army Service Corps
Quartermaster and Lt. William Joseph Clements, Rifle Brigade
Temp 2nd Lt. John Cleemishaw, Royal Engineers
Quartermaster Sergeant Ernest Coates, Rifle Brigade
Lt. Percy Matthew Comflbes, Royal Garrison Artillery
Staff Sergeant Maj. John Connell  Royal Army Service Corps
Quartermaster and Lt. Francis John Cooper, Machine Gun Corps
Quartermaster and Lt. Albert Corney, East Kent Regiment
Temp Lt.George Arthur Costello, Royal Engineers
2nd Lt. Harry Cotten, Royal Engineers
Superintendent Clerk William James Robert Craig, Royal Engineers
2nd Lt. Thomas Cranston, Royal Engineers
Temp Lt. Colin Ross Grombie, Royal Army Service Corps
Temp Capt. Percy Cumming
Gladys Daglish, Department Administrator, Queen Mary's Army Auxiliary Corps
Company Sergeant Maj. John Davis, Royal Garrison Artillery
Gladys Dening, Unit Administrator, Queen Mary's Army Auxiliary Corps
Battery Sergeant Maj. Edmond Doolan, Royal Field Artillery
Temp Lt. Arnold Louis Dugon, Royal Marine Light Infantry
Betty Dundas, Unit Administrator, Queen Mary's Army Auxiliary Corps
Staff Sergeant Maj. Walter Dunham, Royal Army Service Corps
Temp Quartermaster and Lt. William Egan, Royal Irish Regiment
Elizabeth Francis Eldred, Unit Administrator. Queen Mary's Army Auxiliary Corps
Charlotte Emily Elkin, Unit Administrator, Queen Mary's Army Auxiliary Corps
Quartermaster and Lt. James Henry Elliott
Temp 2nd Lt. Percy Elmore, Royal Army Service Corps
Temp Lt. Albert Victor Eustace, Labour Corps
2nd Lt. Charles Falconer Guy Everett, Hampshire Regiment
Temp Lt. Frank Morley Farmer, Royal Army Service Corps
Temp Lt. Eric Athelstane Field, Lab. Corp
Lt. Edward Hubert Field  Royal Field Artillery
Lt. William Samuel Field, Royal Army Ordnance Corps
Staff Sergeant Maj. Frank Fitzgerald, Royal Army Service Corps
Temp Lt. Samuel Ernest Sydney Fitzsimon, Royal Irish Rifles
Temp Lt. Harry Spry Ford, Royal Army Service Corps
Cecily Penrose Foster, Department Administrator, Queen Mary's Army Auxiliary Corps
Sergeant Maj. James Bartholomew Fox, Royal Garrison Artillery
Ada Emily Francis, Department Administrator, Queen Mary's Army Auxiliary Corps
Temp Lt. Arnold Eardley Francis, Royal Army Service Corps
Quartermaster and Lt. Walter Fry
Lt. Edward Cecil Gardiner, Devonshire Regiment
Lt. George Augustine Gee  Royal Garrison Artillery
Lt. John Appollonius Glason, Lancashire Fusiliers
Lt. Julian Glencross, Northumberland Fusiliers
Temp Lt. Alfred Philip Godfrey
Temp Lt. John Forbes Gower, Royal Army Service Corps
Quartermaster and Lt. William Holmes Green, Oxfordshire and Buckinghamshire Light Infantry
Quartermaster Sergeant William Crynant Griffiths, Royal Engineers
Quartermaster Sergeant James Gunn, Seaforth Highlanders
Temp Lt. Thomas Hampton  Essex Regiment
Lt. Nigel Hanbury, Coldstream Guards
Temp Lt. Frank Hancock
Lt. William Handy, Royal Engineers
Temp Lt. Stanley William Hanscombe, Royal Army Service Corps
Staff Quartermaster Sergeant Ernest Edwin Harcher, Royal Army Service Corps
Monica Harcourt-Brown, Department Administrator, Queen Mary's Army Auxiliary Corps
Temp Lt. Wyndham John Dorney Harding
Winifred Maud B. Harford, Unit Administrator, Queen Mary's Army Auxiliary Corps
Lt. Edmund Harman, Rifle Brigade
Staff Sergeant Maj. Joseph Harold  Royal Army Service Corps
Staff S.M George Harrison  Royal Army Service Corps
Lt. Richard Warhurton Hartley, Royal Army Service Corps
2nd Lt. Austin Mozart Harvey, Devonshire Regiment
Ethel Francis Hatch, Unit Administrator, Queen Mary's Army Auxiliary Corps
Temp Lt. William Ashton Hatch, Royal Engineers
Quartermaster Sergeant Walter George Hartnell, Somerset Light Infantry
Temp Lt. Comley Hawkes  Royal Army Ordnance Corps
Temp Lt. Albert Gordon Jones Hawkins
Temp Lt. Ernest George Hayes
Temp Quartermaster and Lt. Harry Haywood, West Yorkshire Regiment
Temp Lt. Charles Hender Henderson, Royal Engineers
Beatrice Hestietha Gundreda Heyworth, Unit Administrator, Queen Mary's Army Auxiliary Corps
Staff Quartermaster Sergeant Arthur Samuel Hicks, Royal Army Ordnance Corps
Regimental Sergeant Maj. Frank Hill, 14th Hussars
Temp 2nd Lt. Thomas Edgar Hill, Royal Army Service Corps
Irene Decima Hobbs, Unit Administrator, Queen Mary's Army Auxiliary Corps
Temp Lt. Alec Hollidge, Royal Army Service Corps
Staff Sergeant Maj. Matthew Holywood, Royal Army Service Corps
Sergeant Maj. Thomas Hunt, Royal Artillery
Temp Lt. Harry Cyril Ingle
Quartermaster and Lt. William Rudolph Vernon Isaac 
2nd Lt. Cornelius John Gershom Jackman, Royal Army Service Corps
Lt. Leonard Edward Sehnas Jackson, Royal Field Artillery
Lt. Francis Henry Jones, Royal Engineers
Diana Mabel Johnson, Department Administrator, Queen Mary's Army Auxiliary Corps
Engr. Quartermaster Sergeant George William King, Royal Engineers
Temp 2ud Lt. Alfred Thomas Kingston  Royal Engineers
Ann Mary Kinross, Unit Administrator, Queen Mary's Army Auxiliary Corps
Quartermaster Sergeant James William Kippen, King's Own Scottish Borderers
Quartermaster Sergeant Edward John Leatherbarrow, Liverpool Regiment
Quartermaster Sergeant Frederick William Leverett, Royal Fusiliers
Temp Cndr. Herbert Stanley Lewarn, Royal Army Ordnance Corps
Harriet Lightfoot, Unit Administrator, Queen Mary's Army Auxiliary Corps
Temp Lt. Arthur Lisle, Royal Engineers
Christian Gray Lorimer, Unit Administrator, Queen Mary's Army Auxiliary Corps
Temp Lt. Francis Hamilton Lyon
Violet Dorothy Agnes Lyon, Department Administrator, Queen Mary's Army Auxiliary Corps
Lt. John William McLaren, Royal Army Service Corps
Temp Lt. Albert Mander, Worcestershire Regiment
Quartermaster Sergeant John Manton, Oxfordshire and Buckinghamshire Light Infantry
Staff Conductor Alfred Charles William Maile, Royal Army Ordnance Corps
Ethel Marsden, Unit Administrator, Queen Mary's Army Auxiliary Corps
Conductor Alfred Walter Martin, Royal Army Ordnance Corps
Quartermaster and Lt. Thomas Mashiter, York and Lancaster Regiment
Temp Lt. Charles Bernard Mathews, Royal Engineers
Sergeant Maj. Frederick Thomas Merrick, Royal Engineers
Agnes Lizzie Middlemass, Asst. Administrator, Queen Mary's Army Auxiliary Corps
Esther Mary Mills, Unit Administrator, Queen Mary's Army Auxiliary Corps
Cecil May Morgan, Unit Administrator, Queen Mary's Army Auxiliary Corps
Isabella Steele Milne, Unit Administrator, Queen Mary's Army Auxiliary Corps
Quartermaster and Lt. William Henry Morris, Royal Berkshire Regiment
Isabella Frances Narracot, Unit Administrator, Queen Mary's Army Auxiliary Corps 
Lt. Stanley John Nathan, Royal Engineers
Temp Lt. James Colin Newman
Heloise Scott Nicolls, Department Administrator, Queen Mary's Army Auxiliary Corps
Temp Lt. Harry Lawrence Oakley
Hon Lt. Count Robert Jean Marie Gaspard O'Gorman
Lt. Henry John Ost, Royal Engineers
Amelia Gertrude Ottman, Department Administrator, Queen Mary's Army Auxiliary Corps
Company Sergeant Maj. George Albert Page, Labour Corps
2nd Lt. John Parker, Labour Corps
Quartermaster Sergeant John Joslin Parker, Royal Army Service Corps
Quartermaster Sergeant William Henry Parr, Royal Army Medical Corps
Lt. Alan Stewart Patten, Royal Army Service Corps
Lt. Herbert Cecil Pearce, London Regiment
Temp Quartermaster and Capt. Sidney James Pearsall, Nottinghamshire and Derbyshire Regiment
Quartermaster Sergeant William John Perch, Royal Army Medical Corps
Lt. Harold William Perryer, Royal Engineers
Lt. Ernest Thomas Adams Phillips, Royal Garrison Artillery
Lt. Harold Lionel Phillips, Royal Field Artillery
Lillian Lestella Elizabeth Georgina Phillpotts, Department Administrator, Queen Mary's Army Auxiliary Corps
Temp Lt. Dennis Fielden Pilkington, Royal Army Service Corps
Quartermaster Sergeant George Potier, King's Royal Rifle Corps
Temp Lt. Wilfred Monsell Powell, 4th Leinster Regiment
Staff Staff Sergeant Maj. Harry Rayner  Royal Army Service Corps
Supdg. Clerk Percy Raphael Regan  Royal Engineers
Margaret Maude Reynolds, Unit Administrator, Queen Mary's Army Auxiliary Corps
Company Sergeant Maj. George James Roberts, Royal Army Service Corps
Temp Lt. Harold Robinson, Royal Garrison Artillery
Mary Rushworth, Unit Administrator, Queen Mary's Army Auxiliary Corps
2nd Lt. Samuel Schaverine, York and Lancaster Regiment
Quartermaster Sergeant William Scott, Royal Army Medical Corps
Quartermaster and Lt. Hardy Sellers, Royal Scots
Temp Quartermaster and Lt. Frederick William Shorney
Lt. Malcolm Macrae Simpson, Royal Army Service Corps
Company Sergeant Maj. George James Small, London Regiment
Lt. Dennis William Smith, Labour Corps
Quartermaster Sergeant Sydney George Smith  Royal Engineers
Mechanic Sergeant Maj. Frank Robinson Smith, Royal Army Service Corps
Temp Lt. Cecil Edward Bartholomew Smith, Nottinghamshire and Derbyshire Regiment
Quartermaster Sergeant Ernest Alfred Smith, Royal Army Medical Corps
Lt. Herbert Alfred George Sorrell, Coldstream Guards
Lt. Leslie Alan Spall, Herefordshire Regiment
Temp Quartermaster and Lt. Harry Spencer  Royal Fusiliers
Cicely Stanhope, Unit Administrator, Queen Mary's Army Auxiliary Corps
Regimental Quartermaster Sergeant Frederick Stapleton, Lancashire Fusiliers
Margaret Starkey, Unit Administrator, Queen Mary's Army Auxiliary Corps
Quartermaster Sergeant George Patrick Steer, Royal Army Medical Corps
Lt. Sidney Francis Hood Stephens, Royal Field Artillery
Temp Lt. Reginald Stevens, Royal Engineers
Temp Lt. William Strang, Worcestershire Regiment
Conductor John Strange, Royal Army Ordnance Corps
Constance Marion Sutton, Unit Administrator, Queen Mary's Army Auxiliary Corps
Quartermaster Arthur Tarbet, South Staffordshire Regiment
Temp Lt. Frank Taylor  Royal Army Service Corps
Lt. William Thomas Thornton, Durham Light Infantry
Quartermaster and Lt. Ernest Henry Tibbs, Royal Army Medical Corps
Staff Sergeant Maj. Robert Tindall, Royal Army Service Corps
Quartermaster Sergeant Maurice Trippas, Rifle Brigade
Lt. Arthur Ralph Trubshaw, Royal Field Artillery
Isobel Agnes Turner, Unit Administrator, Queen Mary's Army Auxiliary Corps
Sergeant Maj. Euclid Brookes Wager, Royal Garrison Artillery
Lt. Earl Basil Kenmure Watson, London Regiment
Temp Lt. Cyril Charles William Webb, Royal Army Service Corps
Gladys Vivien Webb, Department Administrator, Queen Mary's Army Auxiliary Corps
Quartermaster and Lt. Joseph Henry Webster 
Evelyn Janie Welsford, Unit Administrator, Queen Mary's Army Auxiliary Corps
Staff Quartermaster Sergeant Ernest Whitbourn, Royal Army Service Corps
Staff Sergeant Maj. Robert William White, Royal Army Service Corps
Temp Lt. William Frederick Williams, Royal Engineers
Quartermaster Sergeant Roderick Williams, Cameron Highlanders
Lt. Ritchie Wilson, Royal Field Artillery
Temp Lt. Ralph Justly Chatterton Wilson, Royal Army Service Corps
Isabel Charlotte Woodford, Sister, Territorial Force Nursing Service
Quartermaster Sergeant John Alexander Inglis Woods, South Wales Borderers
Staff Sergeant Maj. Walter William Woods  Royal Army Service Corps
Lt. Lionel Sykes Wooler, Royal Artillery
Regimental Quartermaster Sergeant John James Wray, Royal Garrison Artillery
Quartermaster and Lt. Harry Wright
Staff Sergeant Maj. Albert James Yates, Royal Army Service Corps
Temp Lt. Frederick William Young, Labour Corps

Canadian Overseas Forces
Lt. William Edward Carless, Canadian Engineers
Lt. Harry Victor Coles, Canadian Machine Gun Corps
Staff Sergeant Maj. Alexander Meldrum Craig, Canadian Army Service Corps
Lt. George Osborne Hitchin Driver, Canadian Army Service Corps
Lt. Alfred Burchain Harding, British Columbia Regiment
Lt. Cecil Allan Hewett, 78th Canadian Battalion
Lt. Henry Hurl Humphries, Canadian Army Service Corps
Lt. Ian McLean MacDonell, Canadian Field Artillery
Lt. Edward George Palmer, Alberta Regiment
Hon Lt. William Rider Rider 
Sergeant Maj. Arthur Stanley, Canadian Forestry Corps
Sergeant Maj. Frederick Worrall Thorn, Canadian Army Medical Corps
Lt. Reginald Weightman, Canadian Army Service Corps

Australian Imperial Forces
Lt. Leslie Frank Andrews, Australian Pioneer Battalion
Lt. Edwin Mayhew Brissenden, Australian Infantry
Lt. Albert John Cruise, Australian Infantry
Lt. Maberltey Ester Dening, Australian Infantry
Lt. John Harrington, Australian Army Ordnance Corps
Lt. Loftus Hills, Australian Engineers
Lt. Stanley Irwin, Australian Infantry
Lt. James Edward Murray, Australian Infantry
Lt. Ernest Borland Stanbury, Australian Engineers
Lt. George Eric Teague, Australian Engineers
Lt. Maurice Cleary Welch, Australian Army Ordnance Corps

New Zealand Forces
Regimental Sergeant Maj. Henry Lower Carter, NZ Artillery
2nd Lt. Gordon Tate Lucas, NZ Machine Gun Corps

South African Forces
Sergeant Maj. Henry Kimberley, SA Medical Corps

For valuable services rendered in connection with military operations in Italy —
Lt. William John Anderson, Royal Field Artillery
Lt. George William Skeat Armstrong, Royal Field Artillery
Temp Quartermaster and Lt. Charles Bundock, Northumberland Fusiliers
Lt. Amos Burrows, Royal Field Artillery
Quartermaster and Lt. Joseph Cottle, Royal Army Medical Corps
Lt. Theodore Edwin Dodds, Royal Field Artillery, attd. Royal Army Ordnance Corps
Temp 2nd Lt. William Manning Edwards, Lab Cps
Temp Lt. Thurston Hicks Everson, Royal Army Service Corps
Lt. Basil Flexman McMurtrie, Royal Field Artillery
Lt. John Benedict Eyre, Grenadier Guards
Sub-Conductor Sydney Albert Fenn, Royal Army Ordnance Corps
Company Sergeant Maj. Arthur Fieldhouse, West Yorkshire Regiment
Lt. Douglas Gaskoin Fry, Gloucestershire Regiment
Quartermaster and Capt. Herbert John Furler, Royal Army Medical Corps
Lt. Henry Thomas Gilchrist, Royal Army Service Corps
Temp Lt. Douglas Walter Stewart Hacker, Royal Field Artillery
Lt. Norman Hamilton Smith, Royal Garrison Artillery
2nd Lt. Harry Douglas Hopcraft, Oxfordshire and Buckinghamshire Light Infantry
Temp Lt. Alfred Hudson, Royal Engineers
Temp Lt. Harry Carden Jones, Royal Army Service Corps
Temp Quartermaster and Lt. Charles Robert Kilvert, York and Lancaster Regiment
Temp Quartermaster and Lt. William Langston, Royal Army Medical Corps
Sergeant Maj. Joseph Levy, Royal Army Medical Corps
Staff Quartermaster Sergeant William Edward Lovett, Royal Army Service Corps
Lt. James Eugene Mackay, Sussex Yeomanry
Temp Lt. Guy Ross Madden, Royal Army Service Corps
Temp Lt. Noel Lane Matthews, Royal Field Artillery
Temp 2nd Lt. Joe Nelson, Royal Army Service Corps
Temp Lt. Charles Plummer Ratcliffe, Royal Engineers
Lt. Eric John Sainsbury, Royal Field Artillery
Temp Lt. John Alan Slater, Royal Field Artillery
Battalion Sergeant Maj. Denton Smith, Royal Field Artillery
Temp Lt. Gerald Lionel Strina, Royal Army Service Corps
Lt. Ralph Syminton, Royal Field Artillery
Temp Quartermaster and Lt. Richard Allen Taylor  Manchester Regiment
Lt. Sydney Stanley Joe Travers, Royal Sussex Regiment
Lt. Arthur Castle Turner, Royal Army Service Corps
Temp 2nd Lt. Harry Norman Walford, Royal Army Service Corps
Lt. William Walker, Highland Light Infantry
Lt. John Basil Watling, Royal Engineers
Temp Lt. Charles Sydney Williams, Royal Army Service Corps
Quartermaster Sergeant John Edward Willsher, Royal Engineers

For valuable services rendered in connection with military operations in Mesopotamia —
Lt. Robert Smith Aitchison, Royal Army Service Corps
Lt. Alexander Anderson, Royal Army Service Corps
Lt. Ernest Courtney Harold Norman Andrews, Royal Garrison Artillery
Lt. William Ashcroft, 7th Hussars
Temp 2nd Lt. Alec Eustace Azevedo, Royal Engineers
Lt. Fred Banister, Indian Army Reserve of Officers
Lt. Charles Gordon Barber, Indian Army Reserve of Officers
Lt. George Henry Batterbury, Indian Army Reserve of Officers
Lt. John Alton Bell, Indian Army Reserve of Officers
Lt. William Edward Gustave Bender, Indian Army Reserve of Officers
2nd Lt. Gilbert John Beckford Bevan, 21st Burmah Railway Battalion, Indian Army
Temp Lt. John Beynon, Royal Army Service Corps
Lt. John Milligan Blair, East Surrey Regiment
Lt. Arthur Newton Booth, Royal Field Artillery
Lt. George Grahame Brewin, Indian Army Reserve of Officers
Temp Lt. Douglas Archibald Guillan Brown, Royal Fusiliers
Lt. Robert Ashfield Burgess, Royal Horse Artillery
Lt. Charlie Robert Butcher, Indian Army Reserve of Officers
Temp 2nd Lt. Archie George Chester-Master, Royal Army Service Corps
Lt. Edward Maurice Ernest Coghlan, Royal Engineers
Lt. Charles Herbert Cooper, Indian Army Reserve of Officers
Lt. Edward Orme Cox, Indian Army Reserve of Officers
Lt. Harold Oakes Crowther, Indian Army Reserve of Officers
Staff Nurse Agnes Daly, Queen Alexandra's Imperial Military Nursing Service Reserve
Temp Lt. Thomas Danson, Royal Army Ordnance Corps
Temp 2nd Lt. James Edwin Davison, Royal Engineers
Temp Lt. Sidney Arthur Bearing, Royal Engineers
Lt. John Henry Edward de Robeck, Royal Field Artillery
Lt. William Samuel Dickens, Indian Army Reserve of Officers
Temp Lt. Herbert Julyan Donkin, Royal Engineers
Lt. Austin Edward Makinson Dredge, Royal Army Service Corps
Staff Nurse Barbara Elder Duthie, Territorial Force Nursing Service
Temp 2nd Lt. Hen Charles Eccleston, Royal Engineers
Temp Lt. Myles Layman Farr Elliott, Gloucestershire Regiment
Lt. Richard Joseph Falgari, Indian Army Reserve of Officers
Lt. Walter George Harry Filmer, East Kent Regiment
Lt. John Finlay, Indian Army Reserve of Officers
Temp 2nd Lt. George Henry Forster, Royal Engineers
Lt. Ernest William Popplewell Fulcher, Norfolk Regiment
Capt. Alfred Galvin, Indian Army Reserve of Officers
Temp 2nd Lt. Leslie Iam Granti  Royal Engineers
Lt. George William Gravett, Indian Army Reserve of Officers
Temp Lt. Leonard Gutteridge, Machine Gun Corps
Temp 2nd Lt. Denis Leslie Harbottle, Royal Army Service Corps
Temp Lt. Victor Hardy
Lt. Claude Pickering Harris, Supply and Transport Corps, Indian Army
Lt. Robert Charles Hill, 13th Hussars
Temp Lt. Edward Hinks, Royal Army Ordnance Corps
Temp Lt. Alfred Henry Robert Holmes, Indian Army
Temp Lt. Alec Horace Edward Litton Holt, Royal Engineers
Temp Lt. John Boyd Hopkins
Lt. Leonard Hulbert, Indian Army Reserve of Officers
Lt. Herbert Jackson, Indian Army
Lt. William Henry Kingsberry, North Lancashire Regiment
Temp Lt. Theodore Kirwan, Royal Army Service Corps
Temp Lt. Douglas-Woolley Kitching, Royal Army Service Corps
Lt. Reginald Edward Lines, Indian Army Reserve of Officers
Lt. Walter Long  Royal Field Artillery
Lt. William McGrath, Indian Army Reserve of Officers
Lt. George Douglas McNair, Indian Army Reserve of Officers
Lt. Frederick Arthur Malcolm, Indian Army Reserve of Officers
Temp Lt. Gilbert Charles Martin, Royal Army Service Corps
Temp Capt. Everard Ernest Massey, Royal Army Service Corps
Lt. Harry Matthews, Indian Army Reserve of Officers
Lt. Ernest May, Royal West Kent Regiment
Temp 2nd Lt. George Joseph Mercer
Lt. Alfred Minns, Somerset Light Infantry
Temp Lt. William Harold Morgan, Royal Army Service Corps
Lt. Vere Mockett, East Kent Regiment
Temp Quartermaster and Lt. John Sarel Moore, Royal Army Medical Corps
Lt. Francis Peete Musgrave, Sussex Yeomanry
Lt. Nathan Coleman Myers, Indian Army Reserve of Officers
Lt. Edwin McKillop Nicholl, Indian Army
Temp Lt. George Arthur Openshaw, Lancashire Regiment
Temp Lt. Joseph Hubert Owens  Royal Engineers
Lt. Walter Parsley  Norfolk Regiment
Temp 2nd Lt. Donovan William Alan Pragnell, Royal Army Service Corps
Temp 2nd Lt. Victor Robert Penman, Royal Army Service Corps
Lt. Gerald Hugh Power, Royal Warwickshire Regiment
Temp 2nd Lt. John Nathaniel Pring, Royal Army Ordnance Corps
Lt. Richard Bury Ramsbothani, Indian Army Reserve of Officers
Lt. Rana Jodha Jung Bahadur Rana,   Indian Army
Lt. Charles Oliver Caleott Reilly, Indian Army
Temp Lt. Robert Renfrew
Hon Maj. Denis Kingston Rennick, Indian Army
Lt. Ernest Rupert Ridley, Indian Army
Lt. Clifford Rose, Indian Army
Temp Capt. Alexander Lewis Ross, Royal Army Service Corps
Temp Lt. Archibald Rowlands, Army Cyclist Corps
Capt. Frank James Salberg, Indian Army Reserve of Officers
Temp Lt. Stanley Emberick Shurmur, Royal Army Service Corps
2nd Lt. Andrew George Hume Sievwright, Indian Army Reserve of Officers
Lt. Ralph William Smith, Manchester Regiment
Temp Lt. Thomas Smith
Lt. John Thomas Snelgar, Wiltshire Regiment
Temp 2nd Lt. Richard William Spear, Royal Engineers
Temp Lt. William James Leonard Stribling, Royal Army Service Corps
Temp Lt. Charles Arthur Cholmley Steward  Royal Welsh Fusiliers
Temp Quartermaster and Lt. Thomas James Sutton, Royal Army Veterinary Corps
Temp Lt. Frederick Matthias Tobin, Royal Army Service Corps
Lt. John Reginald Howard Tweed, Indian Army
Temp Lt. Gilbert Alexander Urmson, Royal Army Service Corps
Temp Quartermaster and Lt. George Benisford Walker  Royal Army Medical Corps
Temp Lt. Reginald Henry Walker, Royal Engineers
Lt. Harry Walton, Indian Army Reserve of Officers
Temp Lt. Robert Charles Owen Wells, Royal Army Service Corps
Lt. Charles Ernest Wilson, East Kent Regiment
Temp Lt. Robert Drake Williams, Royal Engineers
Lt. Leslie Williams
Temp Lt. John Ramsay Worthington, Liverpool Regiment
Lt. Colin Campbell Whyte, Manchester Regiment
Temp 2nd Lt. Robert Fiennes Wykeham Martin, Royal Engineers
Lt. Robert Montford Michaelson Yeates, Indian Army Reserve of Officers

Australian Imperial Forces
Lt. Frederick Ernest Moore, Australian Engineers

For valuable services rendered in connection with military operations in North Russia (Archangel Command) —
Lt. Leslie Ebenezer Clarke
2nd Lt. Cecil Aubrey Cooper, Royal Engineers
Lt. Frederic Evans, Royal Army Medical Corps
Lt. Leopold Percival Hodson
Temp 2nd Lt. Matthew Barr McNair, Royal Army Service Corps
2nd Lt. William Vincent Rendel
Lt. Eric John Vardon, East Surrey Regiment
2nd Lt. Vsevolod Victor Watson, Royal Garrison Artillery
Lt. Godfrey Fuller Whistler, Royal Field Artillery

New Zealand Overseas Forces
2nd Lt. Allan Frederick Burke, Otago Regiment

For valuable services rendered in connection with military operations in North Russia (Murmansk Command) —
Lt. Robert William Fenning, Royal Engineers
Temp 2nd Lt. Ernest Alfred Johnson, Royal Army Service Corps
2nd Lt. Joseph Thomas Littlehales, Royal Field Artillery
Temp 2nd Lt. James McKerchar, Royal Army Service Corps

In recognition of distinguished services rendered during the War—
Capt. William John Adkins, Gloucestershire Regiment
Lt. Stanley Long Amor
Lt. Joseph Claude Andrews
Lt. Bruce Otinndel Angell
Lt. William Mills Arnot
Lt. Henry James Axten, Royal Fusiliers
Capt. Alan Hugh Sancroff Baker
Capt. Percy Charles Barber, Chaplain
Capt. Hazen Obtis Barnaby, Royal Field Artillery
Lt. Philip Henry Barr
Administrator Constance Theodora Bayley
Capt. Bernard James Beeton
Capt. Roderick Belli-Bivar, Royal Irish Fusiliers
Capt. Charles Burnley Belt  South Staffordshire Regiment
Capt. Harold Leonard Betteridge
Lt. Jack Pelham Percival Leslie Biggs
Capt., Edmund Ivan Montford Bird
Lt. Harry Booker
2nd Lt. John Alexander Bonnyman, Welsh Regiment
Lt. William Bowring
Lt. Henry Edwin Brackenboro
Lt. Charles Joseph Brockbank
Capt. John Brown 
Capt. Walter Edward George Bryant, Royal Fusiliers
Lt. Thomas Leslie Forbes Burnett
2nd Lt. Patrick John Burns, Royal Garrison Artillery
Capt. Walter Leslie Burt, Essex Regiment
Lt. Leonard Charles Bygrav
Lt. David Cairns, Highland Cyclist Battalion
Lt. Arthur Edward Cambridge
Lt. Malcolm Campbell, Royal West Kent Regiment
Capt. Ernest Patrick Carmody, Royal Army Medical Corps
Deputy Administrator Mary Carnley
Capt. Alfred William Carter 
Lt. Hamilton Cassels
2nd Lt. Waiter Ruanley Castings
Capt. John Chambre 
Capt. Charles Kingsley Chandler
2nd Lt. Bernard Cheeseman
Capt. Samuel Clare
Lt. Paul Colbeck, Northumberland Fusiliers
Lt. Richard Awdrey Wihite Collet
Capt. William John Cooper, Australian Flying Corps
Capt. Bertie Frederick Crane
Lt. Alexander Thomas Cranmer, Middlesex Regiment
Lt. William Ernest Cranmer, Middlesex Regiment
Capt. Henry Lumsden Crichton, Army Ordnance Depot
Lt. Richard Llewellyn Crofton
Capt. Wallace Guy Murdock Crothers, Suffolk Regiment
Lt. Stanley Currington, West Riding Regiment
2nd Lt. John Dorrien Constable Curtis  Royal Lancaster Regiment
Lt. Frank Dance
Lt. James Huddart Dand
2nd Lt. Henry Dawes
Lt. William Dawson
Deputy Administrator Florence Day
Lt. George Edward Morgan Dean, Canadian Field Artillery
Capt. Robert Donald
2nd Lt. Francis George Eckford
Lt. Raymond Walter Everett
2nd Lt. Hugh Kingsley Fairbrother
Capt. Thomas Fawdry, North Lancashire Regiment
2nd Lt. Cyril Alfred Firmin, 59th Squadron
2nd Lt. Maurice Boltora Fitzgerald
Lt. John Raven Frankish
2nd Lt. Leonard Freeborn
Capt. Sidney Thomas Freeman
Capt. Oliver Harry Frost  Middlesex Regiment
Capt. Alfred Andrew Fry
Capt. Norman Berwick Fuller
2nd Lt. Angus Robertson Fulton
Lt. Robert George Fyfe
Lt. Ernest Walter Greer
Capt. Thomas Maitland Gerrard
Lt. Harry Herbert Giles
Capt. Stanley Charles Godfrey  Royal Scots Fusiliers
Lt. George Francis Golding
2nd Lt. Robert Clark Graham, North Staffordshire Regiment
Lt. Frederick Grave, London Regiment
Capt. Alfred George Griggs
Capt. Auckland William Wollaston Groome, Norfolk Yeomanry
Capt. Percy Edward Gwyer, Royal Marine Artillery
Capt. Thomas Grove Gordon
Deputy Administrator Marjorie Halcrow
Capt. William Edward Hayward
Capt. Leonard Henshall, South Lancashire Regiment 
Lt. George Alexander Hill  Manchester Regiment
Lt. Charles Edward Hodgson, Royal Warwickshire Regiment
Capt. Harry Hulbert
Capt. Frank Jefcoate, Suffolk Regiment
2nd Lt. Henry Jones
Capt. Henry Richard Kavanagh, Royal Irish Fusiliers
Lt. William Graham Kewley
Lt. Alfred George Knight
2nd Lt. John Morgan Knight
Capt. The Hon Edward George William Tyrwhitt Knollys, London Regiment
Capt. Errol Galbraith Knox, Australian Flying Corps
Lt. John William Langmuir
Lt. Edwin Joseph Langridge, North Staffordshire Regiment
Capt. Ernest Penrlarves Leigh-Bennett
Capt. Alexander Frederick Livingstone, King's Royal Rifle Corps
Lt. Robert Elgin Lloyd Lott, West Ontario Regiment
Lt. Percy Alexander McBain, Australian Flying Corps
2nd Lt. Reginald David Gorrie Macrostie
Lt. Ronald Macdonald, Liverpool Regiment
2nd Lt. William John Maley
Capt. Henry Clifford Mallett
Capt. David Thomas William Manwell, Australia Flying Corps
2nd Lt. Alfred Palmer Marchant
Lt. Lionel Jackson Mars, Yorkshire Hussars, Yeomanry
Capt. Thomas Bertrand Marson, London Yeomanry
Lt. James Buckland Mawdsley, Canadian F.C
Lt. Kenneth Alexander Meek, West Yorkshire Regiment
2nd Lt. Donald Robert Mitchell
Lt. Harold Spencer Morris, Coldstream Guards
Lt. Patrick Henry Morrissey
Administrator Dorothy Coward Muir
Lt. Frank Murphy
Lt. Thomas Hunter Nesbitt
Administrator Florence Mai Shedlock Newton
Capt. Walter Shackfield Newton-Clare
Capt. Bernard John Nicholson
Acting Commandant Charlotte Noel
Lt. Harry Peter Northcote, West Yorkshire Regiment
Capt. William Ewart Nuttall
Capt. Gilbert Palmer, Devonshire Regiment
Lt. George William Panter, Royal Irish Rifles
Deputy Administrator Kathleen Pearce
Lt. Philip Pearce Clay Penberthy, Shropshire Light Infantry
Deputy Administrator Gwenllian Pertwee
Lt. Frederick Peter
2nd Lt. Charles William Phipps
Capt. David Ward Pinckney
2nd Lt. James Morton Pinkerton
Lt. Edward Ernest Porter  Somerset Light Infantry
Lt. Frederick Hartley Postlethwaite
Lt. Frank James Bickley Powell
2nd Lt. William Peter Boulton Pugh
2nd Lt. John Charles Raine
Administrator Aileen Rathbun
2nd Lt. David Morris Rees
Capt. Walter Ricketts, Dragoon Guards
Capt. Allbert Ridley, Dragoon Guards
Capt. Eric Rivers Smith, Middlesex Yeomanry
Capt. James Robinson
Lt. George Wase Rogers, North Staffordshire Regiment 
Lt. George Orchard Roper
Lt. Alexander Jacob Meyer Ross
Lt. Arthur Alfred Rowe, Royal Engineers
Lt. Charles William Rowe, Huntingdonshire Cyclist Battalion
Capt. James Herbert Scandrett 
Capt. Albert Edgar Siddons-Wilson
Lt. Robert John Sladden 
Capt. Archibald Guelph Holdsworth Smart  Royal Army Medical Corps
Capt. Harold Stansfield
Capt. Douglas Stuart Stevenson 
2nd Lt. John Grant McKenzie Martin Stronach
Lt. Frank Susans
2nd Lt. John Sutherland
Lt. William Sutherland, Middlesex Regiment
Capt. John Barry Rankin Swan
2nd Lt. Robert Swan
Lt. Frank Arthur Swoffer, Middlesex Regiment
2nd Lt. Arthur Henry Taylor
Capt. Bernard Archie Taylor
Capt. Leicester Edward Taylor, Royal Engineers
Hon Lt. Hugh Hamshaw Thomas, Royal Field Artillery
Administrator Elizabeth Thomson
Capt. Albert Peter Thurston
Lt. Edward Trist
Lt. Stephen Herbert Twining, Middlesex Regiment
Lt. Henry Waddington, Manchester Regiment
Capt. Hugh Colin Waghorn, London Regiment
2nd Lt. Frank Waldron, Worcestershire Regiment
Lt. Harold Frederick Walker
Lt. Peter Warburton, Royal Garrison Artillery
Capt. William George James Wardle
Lt. Alexander Milne Watson, Shropshire Light Infantry
Lt. William Watson, Highland Cyclist Battalion
Capt. William McIver Watt, Royal Highlanders
Lt. Francis Mapleton Iremonger Watts, Worcestershire Regiment
Capt. Donald Campbell Waylen
Lt. James George Western
Capt. Frederick Thomas Williams, West Yorkshire Regiment
Lt. Gerald Atherton Williams
Capt. Owen Williams
Lt. Andrew McCrae Wilson, Highland Light Infantry
Capt. Alexander Morice Wilsion, 4th Gordon Highlanders
Capt. Francis Alexander Woolfe
Lt. William James Turnbull Wright, Canadian Forestry Corps
2nd Lt. Hugh Joseph Young

Honorary Member
Mulazam Tana, Mahmud Effendi Mustafa Maiher, 4th Battalion, Egyptian Army, attached Royal Air Force, Helmia, Egypt

For valuable services rendered in connection with the War —

Lt. Louis Goodrich Abbot-Anderson, London Regiment
Quartermaster and Capt. James Acheson, Royal Army Service Corps
Lt. Francis Robert Adair, Staff for Royal Engineers Service
Temp Lt. Herbert Windham Adams, Royal Army Service Corps
Lt. Frederick Harold Adcock, Royal Field Artillery
Lt. George Adkins
Temp Lt. Herbert Marcus Adler, Royal Army Service Corps
Maj. John Christie Aitkin, King's Own Scottish Borderers
Quartermaster and Capt. William Harry Akhurst, 7th Hussars
Lt. Sidney Charles Albany, 21st Hertfordshire Yeomanry
Temp Lt. Charles William Alcock, East Surrey Regiment
Temp Lt. Charles Edward Allen, 6th Res. Cav
Capt. Alfred Ernest Allnatt, Royal Inniskilling Fusiliers
Company Sergeant Maj. Henry Anderson, York and Lancaster Regiment
Capt. Robert William Anderson, Army Pay Department
Temp Lt. Thomas Percival Anderson, Royal Army Service Corps
Maj. Ernest St. George Anson, East Surrey Regiment
Temp Maj. George Wilfred Anson  North Lancashire Regiment
Lt. Lionel Gough Arbuthnot
Capt. Cyril Armstrong  Royal Army Medical Corps (Special Reserve)
Capt. Thomas Aston, North Irish Horse
Quartermaster and Capt. Henry Albert Atkins, Staffordshire Yeomanry
Capt. Arthur George Atkinson, Royal Army Medical Corps
Maj. Arthur Joseph Atkinson, East Yorkshire Motor Volunteer Corps
Temp Capt. Ernest Henry Axten, Royal Engineers
Temp Lt. Arthur John Ayden, Army Pay Department
Lt. Frederick Backhaus, West Riding Regiment
Lt. James Bacon, Royal Engineers
Temp Capt. Herbert John Bailey, Royal Engineers
Quartermaster and Capt. George Bertram Baillie, Royal Army Service Corps
Quartermaster and Lt. Roderick Baillie, Royal Artillery
Lt. George Norman Baines, West Yorkshire Regiment
Lt. Horace Munton Baker-Munton  Royal Field Artillery
Capt. Sydney Arthur Ball, London Regiment
Temp Lt. Arthur Gordon Bannatyne, Royal Army Service Corps
Capt. John Ewart Trounce Barbary, Royal Artillery
Temp Capt. George Henry Barber, Royal Army Veterinary Corps
Capt. Henry Gladstone Barcay
Temp Maj. Albert Edward Barnett, Royal Army Medical Corps
Lt. Raymond Barnett, Royal Artillery
Capt. William George Barnfield, Army Pay Department
Lt. Charles Nicholson Barr, Royal Garrison Artillery
Lt. Arthur Walker Barratt, Shropshire Light Infantry
Temp Lt. Herbert Cecil Barrington, Royal Army Service Corps
Lt. Edward William Bartie, Royal Defence Corps
Temp Lt. George Barton
Capt. Ronald George Batchelor, Staff for Royal Engineers
Temp Lt. Henry George Baxter, Royal Irish Regiment
Lt. Robert Charles Bean, Sussex Yeomanry
Capt. Arthur Joseph Beatbie  Royal Artillery
Temp Capt. Lewis Henry Beesley, Rifle Brigade
Quartermaster and Capt. Thomas Guy Beeton, Nigeria Regiment
Temp Capt. Edward Hugh Benn, Royal Army Service Corps
Lt. Walter Bann, Royal Engineers
2nd Lt. Archie Bennett, Oxfordshire and Buckinghamshire Light Infantry
Lt.-Col. Philip Barnett Bentliff, Royal Jersey Medical Corps
Capt. Arthur Cecil Procter de la Post Beresford-Peirse, Durham Light Infantry
Battery Sergeant Maj. Robert Bertram, Scottish Rifles
Temp Capt. William George Beszant, Royal Garrison Artillery
Capt. Frederick Binns, Army Pay Department
Lt. William Birch, Royal Artillery
Mary Cecilia Bird, Unit Administrator, Queen Mary's Army Auxiliary Corps
Temp 2nd Lt. Robert Odell Bishop
Lt. Stanley Bishop, Royal Garrison Artillery
Rev. Mordaunt Elrington-Bisset, Royal Army Chaplains' Department
Lt. Walter James Blackburn, Royal Field Artillery
Maj. Charles Nelson Lindsley Blackmore, 3rd Volunteer Battalion, Hampshire Regiment
Lt. Cecil Patrick Bilackwell
Capt. Alexander Blair, Royal Army Ordnance Corps
Lt. Hubert Poster Blunt, Royal Warwickshire Regiment
Lt. Samuel Boland, Royal Garrison Artillery
Lt. Frederick Bolton, Royal Field Artillery
Temp Lt. John Coulson Bosustow, Duke of Cornwall's Light Infantry
Olive Bott, Unit Administrator, Queen Mary's Army Auxiliary Corps
Quartermaster and Maj. John Bowers, Royal Army Service Corps
Temp Capt. Cecil Bowes-Robinson, Royal Army Service Corps
Temp Capt. Thomas Bowhill  Royal Army Veterinary Corps
Capt. Cecil Hefferon Boyle
Temp Capt. George Richardson Bradbury
Temp Lt. James Bradford, Hampshire Regiment
Temp Lt. Sydney Edward Joseph Brady, London Regiment
Temp Capt. Ernest Livett Brash, Army Pay Department
Lt. George Henry Bratby, Royal Garrison Artillery
Temp Capt. John Vanghan Brett
Temp Lt. Frederick Thomas Bridges, Royal Engineers
Lt. Harold Norman Bright, Yorkshire Regiment
Lt. Eric Evans Broadway, King's Own Scottish Borderers
Capt. William Stewart Ranulf Brock, Special Reserve
Temp Quartermaster and Capt. Henry Campbell Brodie, Leicestershire Regiment
Maj. Richard Brodie, Royal Army Medical Corps
Lt. Leonard Thornicraft Broot, Lincolnshire Regiment
2nd Lt. George Thomas Adams Brooks, Royal Defence Corps
Lt. Cecil Howard Broughton, Royal Engineers
Capt. Arthur Richard Dupuis Brown, Malay States Volunteer Rifles
Lt. Frederick Brown, Royal Field Artillery
Capt. Gilbert Alexander Murray Brown, Royal Engineers
Temp Capt. Stanley Brown, Royal Army Medical Corps
Alice Amelia Brown-Constable, Unit Administrator, Queen Mary's Army Auxiliary Corps
Temp Capt. William Glynes Bruty
Maj. Thomas Hedley Bryant, Suffolk Volunteer Corps
Lt. James Frederick Buchanan, Cameron Highlanders
Temp 2nd Lt. William Thomas Hansford Bugler, Royal Army Service Corps
Sergeant Maj. William Bull, Royal Army Ordnance Corps
Lt. Harold Malcolm Bullock, Scots Guards
Lt. John Walter Bullock, Royal Engineers
Lt. Clarence Burgoyne, East Riding Yeomanry
Temp Capt. Hugh St. George Burke, Royal Army Service Corps
Lt. Edward James Burns, Royal Artillery
Capt. James Douglas Burrows, Essex Regiment
Lt. Reginald Edward Burt, Nottinghamshire and Derbyshire Regiment
Rev. Harold John Chandos Burton, Royal Army Chaplains' Department
Capt. Eustace Norman Sutler, Royal Army Medical Corps
Temp Capt. James Bayley Butler, Royal Army Medical Corps
Capt. James Dickson Butler, Royal Munster Fusiliers
Temp Lt. Claude Henry Buxton, Royal Army Ordnance Corps
Quartermaster Sergeant Albert Cahill, Royal Army Service Corps
Capt. Charles Holt Caldicott  Royal Army Medical Corps
Quartermaster and Capt. Charles Calvey, Royal Army Service Corps
Capt. Alexander Duncan Cameron, Scottish Rifles
Quartermaster and Capt. Thomas Duncan Cameron, Royal Army Medical Corps
Lt. Harold James Campbell, Royal Field Artillery
Temp Lt. John Monck Campion-Coles, North Staffordshire Regiment
Temp Capt. John Valentine Garden, Royal Army Service Corps
Temp Maj. Sidney John Ness Carrington, Royal Engineers
Lt. John R. Carse, Royal Defence Corps
Temp Capt. Charles Frederick Beall Carter, Royal Army Service Corps
Temp Quartermaster and Capt. Thomas Benjamin Carter
Capt. Ronald James Cavaye, Cameron Highlanders
Lt. George Kirby Chambers, Royal Garrison Artillery
2nd Lt. Frederick Joseph Chandler, Royal Garrison Artillery
Capt. Hugh Elphinstone Chandler, Royal West Surrey Regiment
Lt. Frederick Grahame Cheeswright, Royal West Surrey Regiment
Commander George Chenery, Royal Army Ordnance Corps
Temp Capt. Hugh Chesterton, Rifle Brigade
Temp Capt. Cyril Holland Child
Temp Lt. Charles Christian, Royal Engineers
Lt. McCulloch Christison, Royal Highlanders
Lt. Kenneth Christopherson, West Kent Yeomanry
Temp 2nd Lt. Athol England Clapham, Royal Army Service Corps
Temp Capt. Hubert Charles Clark, Royal Army Service Corps
Capt. Derrick Ansell Clarke, South Staffordshire Regiment
Lt. Frederick Clarke, Royal Artillery
Lt. Ernest Clay, Lancashire Regiment
Temp Lt. Thomas Harry Clegg  Manchester Regiment
Temp Quartermaster and Lt. Frederick James Clements, Royal Engineers
Capt. Charles William Clout, Lancashire Regiment
Capt. Frederick William Clover, Army Schools Department
Temp Lt. Henry Percy Cobb, Royal Army Service Corps
Lt. Thomas Cokayne, Nottinghamshire and Derbyshire Regiment
Temp Capt. David Henry Cole, Royal Army Service Corps
Maj. Fritz William Cole, Gloucestershire Regiment
Lt. Lowry Arthur CasaMaj. Cole, Royal Army Service Corps
Quartermaster and Maj. William Henry Collins, 1st Dragoon Guards
Lt. Hugh Francis Connolly
Lt. Frank Reginald Cooksey
Quartermaster and Lt. William James Coombes, Royal Artillery
Capt. Ansell Edgar Cooper, Royal Army Ordnance Corps
Maj. Bryan Ricco Cooper
Temp Lt. Richard Tennant Cooper, Royal Engineers
Temp Maj. Samuel Edward Cooper, Royal Engineers
Capt. Melville Charles Dymock Cordeaux  Royal Garrison Artillery
Quartermaster and Lt. Frederick John Cosgrave, Royal Engineers Kent Yeomanry
Quartermaster and Capt. Thomas Patrick Cosgrove
Lt. Horace Wilkinson Coulson, Royal Engineers
Lt. Percival Arthur Coulter, West Kent Regiment
Temp 2nd Lt. Arthur Bertie Cousens, Royal Army Service Corps
2nd Lt. Ernest Cowley, Royal Guernsey Militia
Quartermaster and Capt. George Cox, Royal Engineers
Capt. Keith Trenchard Cox, Royal West Surrey Regiment
Sergeant Maj. James Coyle, Army Schoolmaster
Lt. Denis Coyne, Royal Field Artillery
Lt. Graham Craig
Capt. James Henry Crane, Royal Army Medical Corps
Capt. Eric Norman Spencer Crankshaw, Royal Fusiliers
Capt. Harold Sugden Crapper
Temp Lt. Henry Rivers Cripps
Temp Capt. William Maxwell Crosbie, Royal Engineers
Lt. Arthur Gordon Cross  Seaforth Highlanders
Lt. James Frederick Crosse
Temp Capt. George Henry Crossley, Royal Army Service Corps
Lt. William Jolin Cullen, Leinster Regiment
Temp Capt. Norman Cunliffe
Annie Curtis, Unit Administrator, Queen Mary's Army Auxiliary Corps
Temp Quartermaster and Capt. William Arthur Curtis, Royal Army Service Corps
Maj. John Clarmont Daniell, Hertfordshire Regiment
2nd Lt. Dlann, William Squire
Capt. John Edward Darby, 3rd Dragoon Guards
Lt. George Graham D'Arcy
Temp Capt. Alec Stuart Davidson, Royal Engineers
Temp Lt. David Owen Davies
Temp Lt. Charles Beverley Davies
Temp Capt. Richard Llewellyn Davies, Royal Army Service Corps
Temp Capt. Robert Davis, Royal Engineers
Carmen Davoren, 1st Class Superintendent, Women's Legion
Lt. Herbert Milner Dawson
Temp Maj. William Bell Dawson  Royal Scots Fusiliers
Lt. George Albert John Day, Royal Garrison Artillery
Lt. William Day, Leicestershire Regiment
Capt. Walter Thomas Dean, Royal Garrison Artillery
Lt. John Gordon Deedes, Royal Engineers
Temp Capt. Edward Denby-Jones, Royal Army Service Corps
Temp Capt. Leslie Lawson De St. Croix, Royal Army Service Corps
Temp Lt. Frank De Tuyll
Capt. Arthur Seymour Hamilton Dicker, Royal Sussex Regiment
Temp Lt. Gilbert Charles Hamilton Dicker
Temp Lt. Robert Dillon
Capt. Enos Doggrell, Royal Garrison Artillery
Lt. Francis Cecil Doherty, Essex Regiment
Capt. Francis Alfred Emilio Dolmage
Capt. George Reid Donald, Royal Highlanders
Temp Lt. John Turner Douglas
Staff Quartermaster Sergeant George James Dowdell, Army Pay Corps
Sergeant Maj. Edgar Thurston Duarte, Royal Field Artillery
Capt. Cyril Raymond Dudley, Lancashire Regiment
Lt. Charles Duncan, Royal Field Artillery
Temp Capt. Thomas Duncan
Lt. William Durbridge, Royal Field Artillery
Temp Quartermaster and Capt. Samuel Cosby Eastwood, Royal West Surrey Regiment
Capt. Frederick Thomas Ecroyd
Lt. Arthur Broughton Edge, Royal Artillery
Capt. Charles Joseph Edwards, Northumberland Fusiliers
Sub-Conductor John Henry Edwards, Royal Army Ordnance Corps
Temp Capt. Henry Gerard Eley, Royal Engineers
Temp Capt. John Alfred Roy Eliot, Army Pay Department
Temp Lt. Harry Charles Ellis, Royal Army Service Corps
Capt. William Richard Ellison, Royal Artillery
Capt. Alexander Lockhart Elsworthy, Royal Dublin Fusiliers
Lt. William Englefield, Hampshire Regiment
Lt. Bernard Scott Evans  Royal West Surrey Regiment
Temp 2nd Lt. Evan Reginald Evans, Royal Field Artillery
Maj. Henry John Archibald Evans, Royal Field Artillery
Capt. Samuel Earnest Evans
Capt. James Wrigley Evatfc, Lancashire Fusiliers
Mary Elizabeth Fairbairns, Commander, Queen Mary's Army Auxiliary Corps
Rev. Henry Farquhar  Royal Army Chaplains' Department
Temp Capt. Frank Farmer, Army Pay Department
Lt. Harry Farrance, West Yorkshire Regiment
Temp 2nd Lt. Cecil Fenton
Capt. John Fenton
Hon Col. William Fenton Fenton-Jones, London Regiment
Temp Capt. John Caldwell Fergusson  Royal Army Medical Corps
Temp Capt. David Field
Lt. Harry William Finlay, London Regiment
Temp 2nd Lt. George Drummond Fish
Lt. Claude Frederick Urquhart Fisher, Royal Army Service Corps
Temp Quartermaster and Capt. William Graham Lawson Fitchett, Royal Army Medical Corps
Staff Sergeant Maj. Wilfred George Fitzwater, Royal Army Service Corps
Capt. Bertram Maughan Footner, Royal Army Medical Corps
Temp Lt. Albert Victor Wells Forsdyke, Royal Army Service Corps
Temp Maj. Frederick Norman Forster, Royal Engineers
Temp Lt. John Kenelm Foster-Melliar
Lt. Rudolph Keane Franks, North Somerset Yeomanry
Maj. Angus George Fraser, late King's Own Scottish Borderers
Temp Lt. George Alexander Fraser, King's Own Scottish Borderers
Temp Lt. John James Fraser, Royal Army Service Corps
Capt. Charles William Froude, Royal Artillery
Temp Lt. Sydney Ernest Fryer
Temp Capt. Charles Fuller, Royal Engineers
Temp Capt. Henry Arthur Gale, Royal Engineers
Sergeant Maj. Sydney Gallie, Royal Army Medical Corps
Temp Maj. Willoughby Lewis Garton, Royal Army Service Corps
Capt. Geoffrey Gatliff Gatiliff, Royal Engineers
Capt. Denny Victor Gedge, Special Reserve
Temp Capt. Richard Westropp George, Royal Engineers
Temp Maj. Andrew Dewar Gibb
Temp Lt. James Baily Gibson, Royal Army Service Corps
Temp Lt. John Montgomery Gibson
Temp Capt. Lewis Evelyn Gielgud
Elizabeth MacFarlarie Gilchrist, Asst. Administrator, Queen Mary's Army Auxiliary Corps
Lt. Vernon Gillam, Royal Artillery
Temp Lt. William Ernest Gillespie, Royal Army Service Corps
Capt. Mowatt Godfray, London Yeomanry
Capt. John Goiggin, Army Pay Department
Maj. Charles Sidney Goldman, Royal Garrison Artillery
Temp 2nd Lt. Julius Israel Goldman, Royal Army Service Corps
Lt. Frank Goldsmith  Royal Garrison Artillery
Temp Lt. Francis Harrison Goodall, Royal Engineers
Quartermaster and Capt. Arthur Goodwin, Royal Army Service Corps
Maj. Peter Graham Graham-Barrow Jess Gow, Unit Administrator, Queen Mary's Army Auxiliary Corps
Temp Capt. Andrew Grant  Royal Army Medical Corps
Temp Capt. Elliott Cecil George Gray, Royal Army Service Corps
Temp Lt. George Gray
Temp Capt. Robert Green, Royal Army Service Corps
Janet Campbell Greenlees, Quartermistress, Queen Mary's Army Auxiliary Corps
Maj. Bernard Eyre Greenwell, Hampshire Yeomanry
Capt. Charles Stainforth Greenwood, late West Yorkshire Regiment
Temp 2nd Lt. Richard Henry Gretton
Quartermaster and Capt. Arthur James Griffin, Royal Field Artillery
Capt. William Alfred Grist, Warwickshire Volunteer Corps
Temp Capt. Walter Groome, Royal Army Medical Corps
Quartermaster Sergeant Alfred Henry Gull, Royal Engineers
Capt. John Gunn
Maj. Herbert Charles Gunton, Co. of London Royal Engineers Volunteers
Capt. Percy Claude Guy
2nd Lt. William Henry Hacker, Royal Engineers
Quartermaster and Lt. Edgar Hall
Temp Capt. Harry Reginald Holland Hall
Temp Lt. Percival Stanhope Hall, Royal Army Service Corps
Temp Quartermaster and Capt. William James Halloran, Cheshire Regiment
Lt. Edward Harry Handley-Read, Machine Gun Corps
Capt. Michael John Hanney, Army Pay Department
Maj. Henry Stewart Hardy  East Kent Regiment
Quartermaster and Capt. William Robert Hargroves, Royal Army Service Corps
Temp Lt. Ernest William James Harley, Royal Army Ordnance Corps
Capt. Ronald Frederick Harmer, Gordon Highlanders
Temp Lt. John Stanley Harper, Royal Engineers
Temp Lt. John Latimer Harpur, Royal Army Service Corps
Squadron Sergeant Maj. Francis George Harris, Royal Army Service Corps
Temp Capt. Worsley John Harris, Royal Army Medical Corps
Capt. Leonard Charles Harrison, Staff for Royal Engineers Service
Capt. Edward William Spencer Cavendish, Marquess of Hartington, Derbyshire Yeomanry
Temp Lt. William Harvey, Royal Army Service Corps
Temp Capt. Reginald Henry Haviland, Durham Light Infantry
Capt. Wilfred Pullen Haviland, Argyll and Sutherland Highlanders
Quartermaster and Capt. George Henry Seymour Hearn  Royal Field Artillery
Temp Quartermaster and Capt. Thomas Hedley, Royal Army Medical Corps
Temp Lt. Theodore Fenwick Hedley
Temp Capt. Frederick Helden, Royal Engineers
Temp Capt. Ernest Palmer Hellyer, Army Pay Department
Capt. Ian Macdonald Henderson, London Regiment
Quartermaster Sergeant John Thomas Henshaw, Bedfordshire Regiment
Temp Capt. Thomas Henshaw, Royal Army Service Corps
Temp Capt. George Herbert, Royal Army Service Corps
Capt. Conrad Pelham Heseltine, Worcestershire Regiment
Quartermaster and Capt. William Henry Hesketh, Royal Garrison Artillery
Maj. Joseph Marmaduke Hicks, Royal Army Ordnance Corps
Capt. Lewis Hide, Royal Engineers
Temp 2nd Lt. Percy John Higson, Royal Engineers
Capt. William Higson, ret.
Temp Capt. Robert Hill
Lt. William Henry Hinton, Royal Field Artillery
Temp Capt. Roland Georgia Hitchcock, Maur. Labour Battalion
Lt. Thomas Hogan, Royal Engineers
Maj. Ernest Frank Holden, Nottinghamshire Volunteer Corps
Capt. Edgar Stopford Holland, Royal West Kent Regiment
Temp Lt. Arthur Ernest Holmes, Royal Army Service Corps
Temp 2nd Lt. Henry Edward Hopperton, Royal Engineers
Lt. Wallace Edward Hoskins, Royal Engineers
Temp 2nd Lt. Septimus Carolus Howard
Maj. Owen A. Howell, London Yeomanry
Lt. Charles Hudson, Yorkshire Light Infantry
Capt. Rev. Richard Huggard
Maj. Hugh Bliss Torriano Hume, Nottinghamshire and Derbyshire Regiment
Quartermaster and Capt. Thomas Humphreys, 6th Dragoon Guards
Capt. Reginald Noel Hunt, Army Pay Department
Capt. John Francis Stuart Hunter, Royal Engineers
Maj. Reginald Stanley Hunter-Blair, late Gordon Highlanders
Garrison Sergeant Maj. Alfred Edward Hurle, Staff
Capt. Henry Hussey, Army Schools Department
Temp Capt. Rowland Radcliffe Huyshe, Royal Army Service Corps
Lt. George Ibbitson, Royal Artillery
Lt. George Blair Imrie, Royal Engineers
Temp Maj. Bernard Sidney Ince
Maj. George Alexander Innes, Royal Scots Fusiliers
Helen Euphrosyne Ionides, Unit Administrator, Queen Mary's Army Auxiliary Corps
Temp Lt. James Augustus Ireland, Royal Army Service Corps
Temp Lt. Percival Jackling, Machine Gun Corps
Temp Capt. Francis Munton Jackson
Capt. Edward Lionel Luscombe James
Temp Lt. Frederick Ernest Janson, Royal Army Ordnance Corps
Temp Lt. Stanley Jay, King's Royal Rifle Corps
Temp Lt. Herbert William Jenks, Suffolk Regiment
Lt. Charles Townsley Jessap, Lincolnshire Regiment
Temp Lt. Frederick Johns, Royal Army Ordnance Corps
Temp Capt. William Alexander Johns, Royal Engineers
Temp Capt. Reginald Johnson  Royal Army Medical Corps
Temp Capt. Oswell Jones, Royal West Kent Regiment
Capt. Robert Jones, Scottish Rifles
Lt. William Everard Tyldesley Jones, Royal Garrison Artillery
Lt. Evelyn Whyaid Joslin, 11th Hussars
Temp Lt.-Col. John Keay, Royal Army Medical Corps
Lt. Ernest Keefe, Royal Horse Artillery
Temp Capt. Harold Balfour Keeping, Royal Army Service Corps
Lt. Raymond Wilfred Cordy Keer, Suffolk Regiment
Lt. Cyril Humby Keitley, Manchester Regiment
Lt. Sydney Kekewich, 21st Lancers
Lt. Thomas Kelly, Army Pay Department
Temp Capt. Charles Matheson Kennedy  Royal Army Medical Corps
Lt. Douglas Neil Kennedy, Royal Defence Corps
Lt. Walter Stewart Kennedy, Royal Field Artillery
Lt. Louis Kenny, Royal Field Artillery
Temp Lt. Robert Kerr, Royal Army Ordnance Corps
Capt. William Watson Killby
Lt. Harold William Kimberley, London Regiment
Regimental Sergeant Maj. Albert Arthur Kingdon, Bedfordshire Regiment
Quartermaster and Lt. Charles Kingston, Royal Army Medical Corps
Isabel Lace-Pritchard, Queen Mary's Army Auxiliary Corps
Lt.-Col. George Lambie, late Trinidad Light Infantry
Capt. Francis Stephen Lanigan-O'Keefe, Royal Dublin Fusiliers
Temp Capt. Rawdon Hastings St. Barbe Laurie, Royal Army Service Corps
Quartermaster and Capt. William Laurie, Royal Army Service Corps
Lt. Andrew Lavery, Durham Light Infantry
Temp Lt. Robert Edward Lawler
Capt. Gray Leaver
Lt. Albert Victor Lee, Cheshire Regiment, Special Reserve
Maj. George Lee, Royal Artillery
Lt. Thomas Goulton Leonard, Royal Garrison Artillery
Temp Capt. Charles William Leslie, Royal Army Service Corps
Temp Capt. Cecil Oliver Gresham Leveson-Gower, Royal Army Service Corps
Jeanne Athol Levy, Women's Legion
Lt. Orpheus William Henry Lewis, Royal Garrison Artillery
Capt. Patrick Lindop, Army Pay Department
Quartermaster and Capt. Albert Arthur Lippold, Royal Army Medical Corps
Beatrice Ethel Lithiby, Unit Administrator, Queen Mary's Army Auxiliary Corps
Temp 2nd Lt. Thomas London, Royal Army Service Corps
Temp Lt. Charles Rawson Longbotnam
Capt. Ernest Victor Longworth
Temp Capt. John Charles Hampden Lucy, Royal Army Service Corps
Lt. Anthony Mario Ludovici, Royal Field Artillery
Temp Capt. Charles Hope Lumley, South Lancashire Regiment 
Lt. Charles Ernest Lumsden, Royal Army Service Corps
Temp Maj. Henry Edward Lyons
Lt. Daniel Archibald McAlister, Shropshire Royal Horse Artillery
Capt. John McAvoy, Bedfordshire Regiment
Henrietta Sutherland McColl, Unit Administrator, Queen Mary's Army Auxiliary Corps
Squadron Sergeant Maj. John Smith McCulloch, Royal Army Service Corps
Capt. Allen Fraser MacDonald, Special Reserve
Temp Lt. Ewen William Charles MacDonald, Royal Army Ordnance Corps
Quartermaster and Maj. James McDonald, Welsh Regiment
Capt. James McDonald, Royal Army Ordnance Corps
Temp Capt. Robert Parker MacDonald
Lt. Alfred McDougall, Royal Engineers
Capt. Walter McIver
Lt. Robert James McKay  Argyll and Sutherland Highlanders
Temp Capt. George McKechnie
Temp Capt. Robert McLaren, Army Pay Department
Capt. and Bt. Maj. Alan McLean, Inns of Court Officers Training Corps
Temp Lt. James McLeish, Royal Engineers
Capt. Creighton William McClellan, Royal Highlanders
Temp Capt. Kenrick James McMullen, Royal Engineers
Capt. Agnew Main MacPhall, Royal Berkshire Regiment (Special Reserve)
Temp Lt. Arthur Manico, Royal Army Service Corps
Grace Mann, Deputy Administrator, Queen Mary's Army Auxiliary Corps
Lt. Thomas Clifford Maun, Royal Engineers
Quartermaster and Capt. James Walter Mansfield
Lt. Frederick James Marohant, Army Pay Department
Lt. Horace George Mason, Royal Garrison Artillery (Special Reserve)
Lt. Denis MacPherson Masters, Royal Garrison Artillery
Capt. Frederick William Matheson, Unattd. List
George Alfred Mathews  Royal Army Ordnance Corps
Lt. Clement Norman Matthews, late London Regiment
Temp Lt. Henry George Meadows, Royal Army Ordnance Corps
Temp Capt. Francis George Mierrett, Royal Engineers
Maj. Harry Francis Metcalfe, Royal Fusiliers
Temp Capt. Percy Kynaston Metcalfe, Royal Army Service Corps
Capt. George Middleton, Army School Department
Lt. Sam Midgeley
Temp Maj. Alfred George Miles, Royal Engineers
Temp Capt. John Smith Tindal Mill, Royal Engineers
Temp Lt. Ernest Norman Milliken, Royal Army Service Corps
Capt. Harry Sturgess Mills  Army School Department
Maj. James Clymo Milton, East Lancashire Regiment 
Margaret Florence Mitchell, Unit Administrator, Queen Mary's Army Auxiliary Corps
Lt. William Alfred James Mitchell, Royal Garrison Artillery
Capt. Archibald Patrick Moir, T.F. Res
Temp Capt. George Molineux, Royal Army Service Corps
Capt. Malcolm Matthew Moncrieff
Lt. John Bird Monk, Honourable Artillery Company
Marjorie Moor, Unit Administrator, Queen Mary's Army Auxiliary Corps
Temp Maj. Harold Mead Moore  Royal Army Service Corps
Quartermaster and Capt. Richard William Moore, Norfolk Regiment
Capt. William Arthur Moore, Rifle Brigade (Special Reserve)
Lt. Arthur Ernest Moreton, King's Own Scottish Borderers
Quartermaster Sergeant Arthur Richard Morgan, Royal Engineers
Temp Lt. John Scammell Morgan
Capt. Phillip Sydney Morgan, Royal Army Veterinary Corps
Maj. Sydney Cope Morgan, South Wales Borderers
Warrant Officer Edward Morris, Army School Department
Lt. Frederick Herbert Morris, Cheshire Regiment
Rev. Patrick Joseph Morris, Royal Army Chaplains' Department
Temp 2nd Lt. William Henry Morris, Royal Army Service Corps
Lt. George Bowen Morton, Royal Field Artillery
Temp Capt. Robert Connell Morton, Royal Engineers
Capt. Harry George Mumford, London Regiment
Quartermaster and Maj. Alfred Munday, Royal Army Service Corps
Dorothy Sarah Murgatroyd, Deputy Administrator, Queen Mary's Army Auxiliary Corps
Maj. Francis Philip Sidney Murphy, Liverpool Regiment
Temp Capt. Francis Joseph Nash, Army Pay Department
Quartermaster and Maj. David Nelson  Lothians and Border Horse
Temp Lt. Giles Fendall Nwto, Royal Artillery
Lt. Herbert John Nias
Christabel Nicholson, Women's Legion
Temp Capt. Norwood Nicholson, Royal Army Service Corps
Temp Capt. Edwin Brownrigg Noyes
Temp Lt. Frank Oates, Royal Engineers
Quartermaster and Capt. Joseph Oborn, Machine Gun Corps
Temp Capt. James Matthew O'Brien, West African Medical Corps
Lt. Edward Henslow Orchard, Royal Garrison Artillery
Temp Capt. Robert Bruce Hamilton Ottley, Royal Army Service Corps
Jean Broomfield Wier Ovens, Asst. Administrator, Queen Mary's Army Auxiliary Corps
Capt. Harold James Page, Royal Artillery
Maj. Basil Owen Palmer, Border Regiment
Ellen Amelia Palmer, Unit Administrator, Queen Mary's Army Auxiliary Corps
Temp Capt. Frank Richard Paramor
2nd Lt. Hugh Love Parker, Cameron Highlanders
Temp Capt. Thomas Mayor Parker, Royal Army Veterinary Corps
Capt. Wilfred Watson Parker, London Regiment
Dorothy Phoebe Parkee, Unit Administrator, Queen Mary's Army Auxiliary Corps
Hon Capt. Herbert Passmore
Sub Conductor Tom Payne, Royal Army Ordnance Corps
Temp Capt. Henry John Pearse, Royal Army Service Corps
Lt. Charles Peart, Royal Artillery
Lt. Vector Newton Peck, Gordon Highlanders
2nd Lt. John Ronald Peddie
Lt. Albert William Peel, T.F. Res
Lt. Hamilton Francis Moore Pellatt  Royal Irish Rifles
Temp Lt. Evelyn Polly, Royal Army Service Corps
Capt. Alexander Philip Percival, South Wales Borderers
Capt. Lewis Arthur Perkins
Violet Perry, Superintendent, Women's Legion
Maj. Cecil Wyburn Peters, late 4th Hussars
Capt. Harry Vaughan Philips
Temp Capt. Horace Stock Phillips, Royal Engineers
Lt. James Charles Joseph Phillips, Royal Army Service Corps
Temp Capt. William Austin Phillips, London Regiment
Temp Capt. Henry Croly Phipps, Royal Army Service Corps
Temp Capt. John Russell Pickering, Royal Army Service Corps
Capt. Henry Pige-Leschallas
Temp Lt. Arthur William Pinder, Royal Army Service Corps
Temp Capt. Arthur Pinsent, Royal Engineers
Temp Capt. Claude Bernard Meister Platt
Temp Capt. Sydney Frank Platt
Capt. Humphrey Pleydell-Bouverie, 5th Dragoon Guards
Capt. Elisha John Pocock, Army Pay Department
Temp Quartermaster and Capt. Richard William Poole, late 
Capt. Samuel Lowry Porter
Temp Lt. George Henry Draper Post, Royal Army Service Corps
Temp Lt. George Teevan Power
Capt. Frank Trevor Power
Maj. Lynch Hamilton Prioleau, late Manchester Regiment
Capt. Roger Cecil Procter, London Regiment
Lt.-Col. Edwin Quayle, Royal Army Medical Corps (Lanc. Volunteer)
Lt. Abraham Quick
Quartermaster and Capt. John James Quinn, Royal Army Service Corps
Temp Lt. George John Rackham
Lt. Alexander Macpherson Rait, Royal Field Artillery
Capt. James Ellwood Ramsdale
Temp Capt. Richard Walter Kimbal Randall, Army Pay Department
Lt. Arthur Richard Rawlinson, York and Lancaster Regiment
Temp Capt. Oswald Theodore Rayner
Lt. Alfred Read, London Regiment
Lt. Stefan Redlich, Royal Garrison Artillery
Temp Lt. Baron Noel Reed, Royal Army Ordnance Corps
Lt. Harry Rees, Royal Artillery
Capt. Edward Charles Reeves, Hampshire Regiment
Lt. Isaac William Reid, Royal Engineers
Temp Lt. James Reid, Royal Army Ordnance Corps
Quartermaster and Capt. Thomas Reilly, Royal Field Artillery
Maj. and Bt. Lt.-Col. David Rennet  Royal Army Medical Corps
Temp Capt. James Bruce Reynish, Royal Engineers
Temp Capt. Philip George Reynolds, Royal Army Service Corps
Lt. R.M. Province Wellesley Richards, Volunteer Rifles
Temp Capt. Joseph Ricketts, Royal Engineers
Capt. Douglas Errington Riddell
Temp Lt. Robert Stacey Marks Rigby, Machine Gun Corps
Maj. Albert Henry Rishworth, East Yorkshire Regiment
Temp Lt. Adam McCall Robertson, Royal Field Artillery
Temp Lt. George William Pearson Roberts, Royal Army Service Corps
Regimental Sergeant Maj. Talbot Vivian Waymen Roberts  South Lancashire Regiment
Lt. Frederick William Robertson, Royal Field Artillery
Margaret Agnes Josepha Robertson, Deputy Administrator, Queen Mary's Army Auxiliary Corps
Lt. William Henry Robinson
Capt. Alfred Lyttleton Roche, Royal Scots Fusiliers
Temp Lt. Gilbert Rogers
Lilian May Rogers, Asst. Administrator, Queen Mary's Army Auxiliary Corps
Temp Lt. William Aldrich Rogers, Royal Army Service Corps
Temp Capt. Charles Bertram Rolfe, Royal Army Service Corps
Temp Lt. Norman Frank Rose, Machine Gun Corps
Temp 2nd Lt. Cecil Rosling, Royal Engineers
Temp Lt. William Sydney Rouse
Temp Capt. James Stewart Rowe, Royal Army Service Corps
Capt. Wilfred Aubrey Rowe
Temp Lt. Charles James Rowlatt, Rifle Brigade
Lt. Frederick George Rowlatt, East Kent Yeomanry
Lt. Albert Rycroft, Royal Artillery
Capt. Frederick Rycroft, Royal Artillery
Judith Mary Sandberg, Unit Administrator, Queen Mary's Army Auxiliary Corps
Maj. William Wellington Sandeman, Royal Sussex Regiment
Lt. Archie Sandercock, Royal Garrison Artillery
Grace Louise Sanders, Deputy Cnr., Queen Mary's Army Auxiliary Corps
Maj. Thomas Alexander Gardner Sangster, Leinster Regiment
Temp Capt. Frank Robert Saward, Royal Engineers
Lt. George Ernest Scholes, Royal Engineers
Lt. Arthur Frank Scott, Lincolnshire Yeomanry
Temp Hon Lt. Eustace Edward Scott, Royal Army Veterinary Corps
Lt. George Alfred Scott, Gloucestershire Regiment
Capt. Keith Stanley Malcolm Scott  Royal Engineers
Lt. Walter Nedham Scott, Lincolnshire Regiment
Temp Lt. Harry Stanley Scrivener, Royal Army Service Corps
Lt. William George Scudamore, Royal Engineers
Capt. Arthur Mackenzie Searle, Royal Engineers
Rev. John Seeley, Royal Army Chaplains' Department
Quartermaster and Capt. Archibald Joseph Sergeant, Royal Engineers
Temp Maj. Boydell Shallis, Royal Engineers
Temp Capt. Richard Shannon
Temp Lt. Ernest John Sharland, Duke of Cornwall's Light Infantry
Temp 2nd Lt. Frederick Francis Sharles
Temp Quartermaster and Lt. James William Shaw, Royal Fusiliers
Quartermaster and Maj. Walter Shean, Royal Artillery
Temp Capt. Alan Douglas Edward Shefford
Capt. Harry Neal Shelmerdine  Royal Field Artillery
Temp Lt. Harry Gordon Shelton, Royal Army Service Corps
Capt. Oswald Clive Graeme Shields  Royal Army Medical Corps
Elizabeth Mildred Shillington, Women's Legion
Lt. Alfred George Shore, Royal Dublin Fusiliers
Temp Quartermaster and Lt. Charles Frederick Showell, Royal Garrison Artillery
Capt. Alan Lachlan Silverwood-Cope, East Kent Regiment
Temp Capt. William Edward Simmett, Royal Engineers
Lt. Robert John Sinclair, King's Own Scottish Borderers
Maj. and Riding Master Thomas Sinneld, Royal Army Service Corps
Lt. Frank Sturdy Sinnatt
Lt. Allan Skelton, West Kent Yeomanry
Quartermaster and Capt. Donald Woodford Smith, Royal Garrison Artillery
Lt. Harold James Smith
Quartermaster and Capt. James William Smith, Royal Army Service Corps
Mary Amelia Smith, Unit Administrator, Queen Mary's Army Auxiliary Corps
Capt. Robert Adam Smith, late Royal Highlanders
Temp 2nd Lt. Soloman Charles Kaines Smith
Quartermaster and Capt. Thomas Joseph Smith, Middlesex Regiment
Quartermaster and Capt. Andrew Spence  Royal Scots Fusiliers
Capt. John Charles Spence
Capt. Lockart James Spence  Royal Army Medical Corps
Temp Lt. Gerald Theodosius Leigh Spencer
Quartermaster Sergeant Richard Spillane, Royal Army Ordnance Corps
Capt. Edwin Gardiner Spinks, Royal Army Ordnance Corps
Temp 2nd Lt. John Kerr Spittal
Capt. Walter Ernest Squire, Royal Army Medical Corps
Temp Lt. Leicester St. Clair Ford, Royal Army Service Corps
Norah Blake Stack, Controller, Queen Mary's Army Auxiliary Corps
2nd Lt. Edward Stafford, Durham Light Infantry
Capt. Herbert Vernon Stanley  Royal Army Medical Corps
Temp Quartermaster and Lt. Robert Ernest Steggall
Lt. Carl David Stelling, London Regiment
Temp Capt. John Stericker, Royal Engineers
Temp Maj. Angus Matheson Stewart, Royal Engineers
Lt. John Henry George Stewart, Royal Engineers
Iza Stitt, Deputy Administrator, Queen Mary's Army Auxiliary Corps
Temp Maj. Archibald Stodart-Walker  Royal Army Medical Corps
Temp Capt. Hubert Leslie Stringer, Royal Engineers
Temp Quartermaster and Capt. Harry Stubbs, Royal Army Service Corps
Capt. Charles Sturgess, Oxfordshire Yeomanry
Lt. Thomas Asquith Shallow, Royal Garrison Artillery
Quartermaster and Lt. Henry James Swinerd, Royal Artillery
Temp Lt. Norman Hillyard Swinstead, Royal Engineers
Temp Capt. Edward Dansy Taylor, Royal Army Service Corps
Lt. Harry Taylor, Royal Engineers
Temp Lt. Archibald Angus Templeton, Royal Highlanders
Capt. Arthur Henry Thomas  Royal Army Medical Corps
Capt. Harold Miles Thomas
Capt. Alexander Brackstone Thomson, East Kent Regiment
Temp Lt. Alfred Louis Thomson, Royal Army Service Corps
Lt. Frederick Charles Thomson, Scottish Horse
Lt. Stanley Russell Thornbery, Royal Army Service Corps
Capt. Frederick John Thome  Royal Army Medical Corps
Temp Lt. Harold John Thorp, Royal Engineers
Temp Lt. Alan Dorrington Thurstan, Royal Engineers
Lt. Frank Walter Tipping, Oxfordshire and Buckinghamshire Light Infantry
Temp Capt. Frederick William Tisley, Royal Engineers
Capt. Harry Stoeker Titchener, Royal Army Ordnance Corps
Temp Lt. Alexander Todd, Royal Field Artillery
Lt. Stanley Charles Tomkins  Special Reserve
Temp Capt. William Toms, South Lancashire Regiment
Temp Quartermaster and Capt. John Tonkinson, Royal Army Medical Corps
Temp Lt. Francis Edwin Friday Tookey
Quartermaster and Capt. John Topliss  Royal Army Service Corps
Temp Lt. Robert Travill, Royal Army Ordnance Corps
Lt. Richard Trenam  Northumberland Fusiliers
Lt. Thomas St. Vincent Wallace Troubridge, King's Royal Rifle Corps
Lt. Frederick James Tucker
Lt. Hubert Thorold Tulloch, Royal Field Artillery
Capt. George Patrick D'Arcy Gregory Tunks, Leicestershire Regiment
Temp Capt. Thomas Montigomerie Turnbull, Royal Army Service Corps
Temp Lt. Alfred Cyril Turner
Temp Capt. Bernard Wilfred Turner, Royal Engineers
Temp Lt. Henry Edmund Guise Tyndale, King's Royal Rifle Corps
Lt. William Tyson, Essex Regiment
Temp 2nd Lt. Reginald Edward Underwood
2nd Lt. John Albert Austin Upham, Royal Guernsey Light Infantry
Temp Quartermaster and Capt. Frederick Charles Vassie, Royal Garrison Artillery
Lt. Richard Henry Vernon, Dorsetshire Regiment
Temp Capt. George Bridges Wade, Royal Engineers
Temp Capt. William Alfred Wale, Seaforth Highlanders
Lt. Austine Harington Walker, Royal Field Artillery
Temp Capt. Samuel Walker
Capt. Weeper Kenneth Walter, Yorkshire Regiment
Sergeant Maj. Hector Wark, Royal Field Artillery
Lt. John Lean Wark
Capt. Claude Alfred Reuben Warren, Argyll and Sutherland Highlanders
Lt. Henry William Warren
Edith Mary Warrior, Unit Administrator, Queen Mary's Army Auxiliary Corps
Temp Capt. George Frederick Mary Waters, Royal Engineers
Quartermaster and Capt. William John Watkins, Gloucestershire Regiment
Temp Capt. Frederick Whittaker Watson, East Kent Regiment 
Temp Capt. Noel Sutcliffe Ogilvy Watson, Royal Engineers
Temp Lt. William Charles Watson, 4th Res. R. Cav
Quartermaster and Capt. Frederick John Webb, Royal Engineers
Maj. Henry Smith Webb, Royal Army Medical Corps
Quartermaster and Capt. Thomas Webb, Royal Army Service Corps
Temp Maj. Thomas Duncan Weir, Royal Engineers
Maj. Sidney Chaytor Welchman, South Staffordshire Regiment
Lt. Henry Bensley Wells, Royal Artillery
Temp Capt. Stanley Walter Wells, Royal Army Service Corps
Temp 2nd Lt. George Henry Westoott, Royal Army Service Corps
Capt. Norman Whatley
Temp Maj. Bruce Gordon White, Royal Engineers
Temp Capt. William Edward de Bagulegh Whittaker
Capt. William Whittington, Yorkshire Regiment
Capt. Charles Warwick Whitworth, West Yorkshire Regiment
Temp Capt. Harold Herbert Wiles, Labour Corps
Capt. Dennison Alfred Wilkins, East Kent Regiment
Temp Lt. Harry Willes, Royal Garrison Artillery
Temp Lt. Charles Williams, Royal Engineers
Temp Lt. Harold Williams, Royal Army Service Corps
Temp Maj. John Montague Williams, Royal Engineers
Temp Lt. Leonard Lowther Williams  Royal Engineers
Lt. Richard Barclay Williams, Royal Engineers
Hon Maj. Harry Richard James Willis, late 7th Dragoon Guards
Temp Lt. Frederick William Willmott
Aphra Phyllis Wilson, Asst. Administrator, Queen Mary's Army Auxiliary Corps
Temp Capt. John Wilson
Quartermaster and Capt. William Robert Wilson, South Wales Borderers
Temp Capt. Arthur Bluett Winch
Quartermaster and Capt. James Moffet Windrum, Royal Guernsey Militia
Temp Capt. Henry Parr Winstanley, Royal Army Service Corps
Lt. James Daniel Wolff, Royal Artillery
Quartermaster and Lt. Fred Wombwell, Bedfordshire Regiment
Temp Capt. Alexander Wood, Northumberland Fusiliers
Edith Francis Wood, Unit Administrator, Queen Mary's Army Auxiliary Corps
Capt. Charles Reynolds Woodruff, Royal Army Medical Corps
Temp Capt. Reginald George Woolley
Temp Capt. Charles Gordon Woolway, Royal Engineers
Temp Capt. Ernest Harry Woosley, Royal Army Ordnance Corps
Temp Capt. Herbert Wootton, Huntingdonshire Cyclist Battalion
Temp Capt. Herbert Arthur Wootton
Temp Capt. John Armour Wotherspoon, Royal Engineers
Temp Capt. Charles Wright, Royal Army Ordnance Corps
Temp Capt. Sydney Arthur Wright, Royal Army Service Corps
Maj. Thomas Kendall Wright, West Riding Regiment
Lt. George Ernest Yarrow, Northumberland Fusiliers
Temp Capt. Thomas Jenkin Yorwerth, Royal Army Service Corps
Temp Lt. Bertram John Young
Temp Hon Lt. Charlie Young, Royal Army Veterinary Corps
Capt. Harry Robert Young, late Royal Engineers
Capt. Richard Horton Young
Capt. John Stirling Yule, Royal Field Artillery

Canadian Forces
Maj. Christopher George Seymour Bagot, Canadian Forestry Corps
Lt. Martin Surney Gaine, Alberta Regiment
Capt. Ivor Castle
Lt. Thomas Walter Clarke, Canadian Railway Troops
Lt. Alexander Cox, Saskatchewan Regiment
Lt. Thomas Dickson Currie, Canadian Railway Troops
Hon Lt. Charles Townley Curry
Quartermaster and Hon Capt. Harry Van Norman Duggan, 1st Central Ontario Regiment
Capt. John Edward Evans, Canadian Army Pay Corps
Lt. Thomas Heaton Gallon, Manchester Regiment
Lt. William James Gault, Canadian Field Artillery
Lt. George E. Gibson, Canadian Army Service Corps
Quartermaster Arthur Douglas Gordon, Saskatchewan Regiment
Temp Maj. Stewart Gordon, Canadian Forestry Corps
Quartermaster and Hon Capt. Walter Hardman, Canadian Railway Troops
Regimental Sergeant Maj. Harry Harrison, Canadian Artillery
Lt. Frederick Morgan Holden, Alberta Regiment
Capt. Hansord Hora, Canadian Forestry Corps
Quartermaster and Hon Capt. John Hutcheson, Canadian Army Medical Corps
Regimental Sergeant Maj. Samuel Jones Jaminson, 1st Central Ontario Regiment
Hon Lt. Edwin William Jolmson
Temp Lt. William Henry Jones, Canadian Army Service Corps
Company Sergeant Maj. William McDerment, Canadian Army Dental Corps
Temp Capt. James McLean, Canadian Forestry Corps
Hon Capt. Joseph Charles Perry, British Columbia Regiment
Temp Maj. William Henry Rice, Canadian Forestry Corps
Lt. George William Robinson, Manchester Regiment
Temp Lt. John Clifford Seybold, Canadian Army Pay Corps
Lt. John Sheff  West Ontario Regiment
Temp Lt. George Wilmot Rae Simpson, Canadian Army Pay Corps
Staff Quartermaster Sergeant Andrew Gibson Sinclair, Saskatchewan Regiment
Temp Capt. John Howard Slayter, Canadian Army Medical Corps
Hon Lt. Stanley Oscar Smith
Lt. Frank Aldham Smythe, East Ontario Regiment
Lt. Harry Joseph Starratt, Canadian Cyclist Battalion
Lt. Harry Wilson Sutherland  East Ontario Regiment
Temp Lt. William Bryson Thomas, Canadian Army Pay Corps
Lt. Davil Holland Tomlinson, Alberta Regiment
Lt. William Hamilton Vernon, Canadian Royal Artillery
Lt. Wilfred Wellington Wilson, Alberta Regiment
Quartermaster and Hon Maj. Edwin Sydney Woodiwiss, Canadian Army Medical Corps

Australian Imperial Forces
Lt. Robert Lancelot Andrewes, 26th Australian Infantry Battalion
Capt. Mark Berryman, 2nd Australia Division
Capt. William Reginald Bingle, 39th Australian Infantry Battalion
Hon Capt. Archibald du Bourg Broad
Hon Capt. Joseph Hector Brown
Lt. Phillip Caro, 2nd Australia Tunneling Company
Capt. Gerald Mossman Carr, 24th Australian Infantry Battalion
Quartermaster and Hon Lt. Arthur Charlesworth, Australian Army Medical Corps
Lt. Harry Crome, Australian Army Pay Corps
Capt. David Robert Crooks
Lt. Cyril Davy, 15th Australian Infantry Battalion
Lt. Cyril Talbot Docker, 18th Australian Infantry Battalion
Quartermaster and Hon Capt. John Raymond Drummond, Australian Army Medical Corps
Lt. Theodore Phillip Grace, 56th Australian Infantry Battalion
Lt. Ernest Virtue Hall, 3rd Australia Divisional Trn
Capt. Harold Stanley-George Hall
Lt. Reginald Stafford Healy, 54th Australia Inf Battalion
Lt. John Herbert Wallace Henry
Lt. William Malcolm Herriott, Australian Imperial Force
Lt. Harry Claude Ikin
Capt. Alfred James Jessep, 5th Australia Divisional Engineers
Quartermaster and Hon Lt. Frederick Nicholas Laird
Quartermaster and Hon Capt. Frederick Ernest Lanipe
Lt. Melville Cecil Langslow, Australian Army Pay Corps
Lt. Eric Nathan Samuel Lawrence, Army Provost Corps
Lt. Theodore Harold Levy, Australian Army Provost Corps
Capt. Edmund James Long, Australian Army Provost Corps
Capt. Kenneth McLellan, 11th Australian Infantry Battalion
Capt. Reginald Harry Mohr, Australian Army Pay Corps
Quartermaster and Hon Capt. Reginald William Murphy
Quartermaster and Hon Capt. John Francis Stuart Murray  Australian Army Medical Corps
Temp Capt. Alexander Newlands
Hon Capt. Harold Norris
Quartermaster and Hon Capt. Cecil Stanley Price, Australian Army Medical Corps
Lt. Vernon Edward Robley, Australian Army Pay Corps
Capt. Thomas Frederick Rossiter, 23rd Australian Infantry Battalion
Lt. Miles Stanforth Cator Smith, 44th Australian Infantry Battalion
Capt. Michael Sorensen
Lt. Charles Edward Spittal, Australian Army Pay Corps
Capt. Robert MowbrayWinston Thirkell, 12th Australian Infantry Battalion
Capt. Arthur George Tyler, Australian Army Postal Corps
Capt. Douglas Bingham Wheeler
Lt. Roy Vincent Wilson

New Zealand Forces
Capt. William Atwell, NZ Service Corps
2nd Lt. Norman Bell, NZ Army Service Corps
Capt. Charles Henry Booth, Auckland Regiment
Maj. John Thomas Bosworth, NZ Service Corps
Capt. Arthur William Brocks
Maj. Henry Harwood Brown, NZ Service Corps
Capt. William Caesar Sarsfield Colclough, NZ Service Corps
Maj. Albert Arthur Corrigan
Capt. David Cecil Wallace Cossgrove
Maj. Walter Crowther
Capt. William Dobson
Lt. David Alexander Ewen
Capt. Frederick Charles Gentry
Maj. William Richmond Hursthouse, NZ Defence Staff
Capt. David Nathan Isaacs, NZ Medical Corps
Lt. William Jack, NZ Medical Corps
Maj. Henry Jolly
Capt. James Robert Kirk, Wellington Regiment
Capt. Edward Cronin Lowe  NZ Army Medical Corps
Rev Edward Elliott Maiden, NZ Chaplains' Department
Capt. James Seaton Martin, NZ Army Pay Corps
Maj. Robert Saxon Matthews, NZ Service Corps
Capt. Samuel Mellows
Maj. Oden Moller
Maj. James Alfred Northcote
Maj. Henry Charles Nutsford, NZ Service Corps
Capt. Matthew Henry Oram
Lt. Henry William Osborne, Canterbury Regiment
Maj. William Haddon Pettit, NZ Medical Corps
Capt. Lawrence Victor Porteous, Wellington Regiment
Capt. William Pryor
Lt. Arthur Gilbert Quartley, Auckland Regiment
Capt. Henry Joseph Redmond, NZ Service Corps
2nd Lt. Arthur James Ridler, NZ Field Artillery
Maj. Thomas Hazlett Ringland
Maj. Norman John Rishworth, NZ Defence Staff
Maj. David Brett Shand
Capt. George Walker, NZ Service Corps
Rev Walter Sim Winton, NZ Chaplains' Department
Capt. Roy Wilds Fry Wood, Auckland Regiment

South African Forces
Capt. Gerald Spencer Coghlan, SA Medical Corps
Lt. Norman Nuttall Ellis, SA Postal Corps
Lt. Arthur Reginald Knibbs, SA Infantry
Capt. Edward Alder Legge  SA Reserve Brigade
Quartermaster and Hon Lt.-Col. George Merritt, SA Medical Corps
Lt. William Ernest Tucker, SA Infantry
Staff Sergeant Maj. John Hamilton Walker, SA Infantry

Newfoundland Forces
Capt. Hugh A. Anderson, O.F.
Capt. Cyril C. Duley, Royal Newfoundland Regiment
Capt. James M. Howley, HQ Staff
Capt. Frederick W. Marshall, O.F.
Capt. J. J. O'Grady, Royal Newfoundland Regiment
Quartermaster and Hon Capt. Herbert A. R. Outerbridge,  Royal Newfoundland Regiment
2nd Lt. William Reeves
Lt. Herbert M. Winter, Royal Newfoundland Regiment

Civil Division
British India
Walter Charles Abel, Superintendent, Government Printing Press, Allahabad, United Provinces
Chidambara Rajagopala Aiyar, Assistant Controller of War Accounts
Alfred Alexander, Manager, Buckingham Mills, Madras
Margaret Alexander, Patna Branch of the Combined Red Cross and St. John Ambulance Associations, Bihar and Orissa
Eleanor Florence Anderson, Honorary Secretary, Monro Soldiers Canteen
Maud Anson, Comforts for the Troops Fund, North-West Frontier Province
William Staveley Armour, Superintendent Publicity Bureau, Allahabad, United Provinces
M. R. Ry. Rao Bahadar Tiruvalyangudi Vijayaraghava Achariyar Avargal, Diwan of Cochin, Madras
Rai Sahib Raj Bahadur, Chairman of the Etah\Municipal Board, United Provinces
Augustus Baker, Engineer, Bombay Mint
Christine Baldwin, Red Cross Assooation, North-West Frontier Province
Helen Balthazar, Red Cross Depot, Rangoon, Burma
Walter Cecil Bamford, Deputy Superintendent, Telegraph Engineering, Central India
Constance Bewley, Secretary, Ladies War Fund, Dacca, Bengal
Cissie Booker, Voluntary Worker, YMCA, Jubbulpore, Central Provinces
The Rev. John Jennings Dingle Borlase   Junior Chaplain, Indian Ecclesiastical Estab., St. Marks Church, Civil and Military Station, Bangalore, Mysore State
Sharnalata Bose, Dacca Branch of the Lady Carmichael Bengal Women's War Fund, Bengal
Second Lt. Charles William Bowles, Indian Defence Force, State Engineer, Patiala, Punjab
The Honourable Finetta Madeline Julia Bruce, Red Cross Association, North-West Frontier Province
Florence Buist, Red Cross Association, Rawalpindi, Punjab
Kathleen Byrne, Lady Superintendent, of the Dehra Dun Nursing Division of the St. John Ambulance Brigade, United Provinces
Sarah Cain, Secretary of the Dummagudem Red Cross Centre, Godavari District, Madras
Manijeh Sorabjee Capt., Bombay
Mary Cartwright, Red Cross Depots, Anantapur and Tinnevelly, Madras
Gertrude Caseon, Red Cross Depot, Ambala, Punjab
Babu Bishan Chand, Deputy Collector, Etawah, United Provinces
Lala Ram Chandra, Indian Civil Service, Assistant Commissioner, Lyallpur, Punjab
George Alfred Chapman, Station, Master, Quetta, Baluchistan
Babu Sukumar Chatterjeej Provincial Civil Service, Sadar Sub-Divisional Officer, Pabna, Bengal
Alice Ghatterton, Red Cross and St. John Ambulance Associations, Bangalore, Mysore State
Babu Guru Charan de Chaudhuri, Extra Assistant Commissioner, Sylhet, Assam
Hugh Cook Clark, Head Engineer, Calcutta Mint
Reuben Arthur Clarke, Superintendent in charge, Central Telegraph Office, Simla and Delhi
Edna Katherine Compton, Honorary Secretary of the Bangalore Soldiers Aid Committee, Mysore State
Ethel Sophie Cox, Voluntary Worker, Church of England Institute for Soldiers, Bangalore, Mysore State
Evelin Florence Conran Cox, Voluntary Worker, YMCA and Church of England Institute for Soldiers, Bangalore, Mysore State
Babu Birendra Kishor Das, Superintendent, Athgarb State, Bihar and Orissa
Capt. George Edward Dean, Indian Army Reserve of Officers, Inspector of Police, Assistant Recruiting Officer, United Provinces
Rao Sahib Rukhmaji Mankoji Dhatrak, District Assistant Recruiting Officer, Amraoti, Berar, Central Provinces
Babu Jogesli Chandra putt, Provincial Civil Service, Sub-Divisional Officer, Gaibandha, Bengal
Ernest Henry Dwane, Chief Accountant and Auditor, Nizams Guaranteed State Railway, Secunderabad, Hyderabad (Deccan)
Khan Sahib Shaik Ebrahimji, Sind, Bombay
Bhicaijee Ardeshir Engineer, Secretary to Seva Sedan, Bombay
Evelyn Ewart, Indian Women's Branch of the Red Cross, North-West Frontier Province
Edmund Eyres, Head of the firm of Messrs. E. Eyres. and Co., Bombay
Rhoda Fagan, Organiser, Comforts for Soldiers, Bangalore, Mysore State
Kenneth De Quincey Fink, Superintendent, Foreign and Political Department of the Government of India
Eveline Firminger, St. John Ambulance Association, Calcutta, Bengal
Elsie Beatrice Fisk, in charge of the Sandes Soldiers Home, Quetta Branch, Baluchistan
Hubert St. Clair Freitas, Registrar, Office of the Private Secretary to His Excellency the Viceroy
Frances Emily Frizelle, Red Cross and Comforts for Troops Funds, Rawalpindi, Punjab
Alfred Joseph Fry, Electrician to the X-Ray Institute, Dehra Dun, United Provinces
Sister Grace Elizabeth Gaiger, Nursing Sister, Cumballa War Hospital, Bombay
Lala Ram Gopal, Accountant-General, Jind State, Punjab
Rose Govindarajulu, Lady Medical Officer, Mysore Maternity Hospital, Bangalore City, Mysore State
Hyginus Dominic Gracias, Assistant Controller of War Accounts
Sarat Kumar Datta Gupta, Deputy Controller of War Accounts
Capt. Alan Guthrie, Deputy Controller of Hides, Madras
Louise Banks Gwyther, Comforts for the Troops Fund, Shillong, Assam
Maung Myat Tha Gyaw, Regimental Sergeant Maj. TDM Provincial Civil Service, Extra Assistant, Commissioner (4th Grade), Sub-Divisional Officer, Taikkyi, Burma
Ma Le Gyi, Red Cross Association, Amherst District, Burma
George Thomas Hall, Deputy Superintendent, Survey of India (retired), and Municipal Commissioner, Civil and Military, Station, Bangalore, Mysore State
William George Augustin Hanrahan, Acting General Secretary, St. John Ambulance Association
Maj. Harold Maitland Haslehust, Indian Army Reserve of Officers, Assistant Superintendent, Bombay Police, lately Divisional Recruiting Officer for the Hyderabad State, Hyderabad (Deccan)
Phyllis Hearn Monro, Soldiers Canteen, Amballa
Margaret Herbert, Red Cross Association, Shillong, Assam
Alice Hickley, Red Cross Association, Muzaffafpur District, Bihar and Orissa
Arthur Denys Salusbury Highton, Agent, Bank of Bengal, Lucknow, United Province
Ma E. Hmyin, Red Cross Association, Prome, Burma
Eva Hogan Monro, Soldiers Canteen, Saharanpur
Gladys Muriel Hunt, Honorary Secretary of the National Service Bureau, Bombay
May Imrie, Voluntary Worker, YMCA, Jubbulpore, Central Province
Capt. George Skinner Ingram, Business Manager, United Provinces War Journal, Allahabad, United Provinces
John Rajaratnara Isaac, Gen. Secretary, YMCA, Bangalore, Mysore State
Violet Jackson, Organiser, War Charities, Garo Hills, Assam
Edith Alma Johnston, Red Cross and Comforts for the Troops Fund, Bhagalpur, Bihar and Orissa
Rosalie Johnston, Secretary, Hyderabad Ladies War Relief Association, Hyderabad (Deccan)
Pandit
Satyanand Joshi, Assistant Editor, United Provinces War Journal, United Provinces
Khan Sahib Yusuf Kanoo, Merchant of Bahrein, Persian Gulf
Ruby Kempster, Honorary Secretary, Red Cross Association, Lucknow, United Provinces
Joseph Abner Kendall, Superintendent, Central Red Cross Depot, Cawnpore, United Provinces
Rose Alice Kenyon, Mateon of the Cumballa War Hospital, Bombay
Khan Bahadur, Muhammad Abdul Karim Khan  Kundi of Gul Imam, Provincial Civil Service, District Judge, Dera Ismail Khan, North-West Frontier Province
Ali Sher Khan, District Assisting Recruiting Officer, Saugor, Central Provinces
Nawb Allahdad Khan, Alizai, of Dera Ismail Khan, North-West Frontier Province
Khan Bahadur Mir Ahmad Khan Arbab, Provincial Civil Service, retired Extra Assistant Commissioner of Landi Yarghajo, Peshawar, North-West Frontier Province
Khan Bahadur Ghulam Qadir Khan, Munshi, Provincial Civil Service, Revenue Extra Assistant Commissioner at Dera Ismail Khan, North-West, Frontier Province
Khan Sahib Jangul Khan, late acting Sardar of the Belkhel Musakhelsi, Baluchistan
Khan Bahadur Sardar Mian Khan, Head of the Kurd tribe, Baluchistan
Khwaja Muhammad Abdul Majid Khan, Provincial Civil Service, Extra Assistant Commissioner, Gurgaon, Punjab
Khan Bahadur Shakar Khan, Jamaldini, Sarhaddar, Kacha, Baluchistan
Kunwar Muhammad Ubaidullah Khan, Khan Bahadur, Honorary Magistrate of Dharampur in the Bulandshahr District, United Provinces
Zaka-ud-din Khan, Provincial Civil Service, Extra Assistant Commissioner, Hissar, Punjab
Ethelred Mary Knollys, Indian Com forts for the Troops Fund, Delhi
Samuel Laver, Secunderabad, Hyderaabad (Deccan)
Ellen Laville, Red Cross Depot, Mysore State
Harriet Louise Lee, Voluntary War Worker, Bangalore, Mysore State
Charles Lister, Bangalore Woollen, Cotton and Silk Mills Company, Mysore State
Diogo Xavier Lobo, Officiating Treasury Officer, Bushire, Persian Gulf
Francis James Loughlin, Postmaster, Peshawar, North-West Frontier Province
Ethel Lowsley, Honorary Secretary to the Coimbatore Centre Of the Red Cross Association, Madras
The Reverend Bernard Lucas, Gen. Secretary, South India District Committee of the London Missionary Society, Mysore State
Agnes Edith Stewart Maclver, Red Cross Depot, Tinneveliy, Madras
William George Mackay, Engineer, Bombay Mint 
Malcolm Ayers Mackenzie, Superintendent of Police, Hazaribagh, Bihar and Orissa
Edith Mary Madeley, Joint Secretary of the Ladies Recreation Club, Madras
Dinshaw Eduljee Mahawa, Superintendent, Parsi Division of the St. John Ambulance Brigade, Bombay
Babu Kishen Lai Maheshri, Merchant, Dibrugarh, Assam
Rai Bahadur Lala Harji Mai, Khana of Peshawar City, Municipal Commissioner, Banker and Mill-owner, North-West Frontier Province
Babu Gangsin Marak, of Baghmara, Garo Hills, Assam 
Jloraha Nusserwanji Marker, Superintendent, Cosmopolitan Division of St. John Ambulance Brigade, Bombay
Harry Ralph McHugh, Deputy Superintendent, Telegraph Engineering, 1st Class, Cawnpore, United Provinces
Rao Sahib Antony Simon Gabriel Michael, Shipping Clerk, Office of Deputy Controller, Timber Supplies, Burma
Lewis William Michael, Superintendent, Municipal Markets, Bombay City, Bombay
Edith Agnes Ida Mignon, War Depot, Calcutta, Bengal
Herbert Minson, Indian Civil Service, Under Secretary to the Government of the Suited Provinces
Henry St. John Morrison, Deputy Superintendent of Police, First Grade, Bihar and Orissa
Second Lt. Abul Lais Saad-ud-Din Muhammad, Assistant Recruiting Officer, Sylhet, Assam
Lala Raj Narain, Executive Engineer, Etawah, United Provinces
Lala Suraj Narayan, Provincial Civil Service, Extra Assistant Commissioner, Rohtak, Punjab
Capt. Pandit Kashi Nath, Deputy Collector, United Provinces
Alice Elizabeth Maud, Newton, Secretary, Ladies Branch, Joint War Committee, Mhow Centre, Central India
Una O'Dwyer, Punjab
John Ninian Oliphant, Deputy Conservator of Forests, Lakhimpur, United Provinces
Rao Sahib Balkrishna Anant Palekar, District Assistant Recruiting Officer, South Ratnagiri, Bombay
Ronald Parsons, Personal Assistant to the Military Secretary to His Excellency the Viceroy
Babu Anirudha Patel, Superintendent of the Nayagarh State, Bihar and Orissa
Maude Marion Phelps, Indian Comforte for the Troops Fund, Simla
Mary Catherine de Rhé Philipe, Red Cross and Comforts for the Troops Fund, Larore, Punjab
Amy Pocklington, Secretary of the Kashmir Red Cross Committee, Kashmir State
Edith Powell, Red Cross Associations, Rawalpindi and Murree, Punjab
Lala Sheo Prasad, of Bareilly, United Provinces
May Pratt, War Depot, Calcutta, Bengal
Rai Bahadur Lala Barkat Ram, Honorary Magistrate, Gujranwala, Punjab
Mary Ellen Rankin, St. John Ambulance Association, Darjeeling, Bengal
Richard Riley, Manager, Carnatic Mills, Madras
Lilian Muriel, Rivett-Carnac Voluntary Worker, Church of England Institute for Soldiers, Bangalore, Mysore State
Sister Janet Robertson, Nursing Sister, Cumballa War Hospital, Bombay
John Joseph Fisher Rodericks, Presidency Postmaster, Calcutta, Bengal
Honorary Capt. Rivers Thomas Rodgers, Indian Medical Department, Superintendent Indian Medical Department, Superintendent, Central Jail, Jubbulpore, Central Provinces
Babu Niranjan Roy, Provincial Civil Service, Sadar Sub-Divisional Officer, Tippera, Bengal
Rao Bahadur Keshavji Nathu, Sailor, Bombay
Nell Sears, Monro Soldiers Canteen, Delhi
Arthur Freakish Sells, Consul for Denmark and Head of the Bombay Branch of Messrs. Cox and Co., Bombay
Khan Bahadur Mian Musharraf Shah, Kaka Khel, of Ziarat Kaka Sahib, Peshawar District, North-West Frontier Province
Khan Bahadur Syed Mehr Shah Kharsin, Head of the Kharsins of Durg, Baluchistan
Lt. Cyril Hay Shaw, Deputy Controller of War Accounts
Maung Ba Shin, Barrister-at-Law, Rangoon, Burma
Winifred Simpson, Bengal Women's War Fund Depot, Calcutta, Bengal
Rai Amarpal Singh, Taluqdar of Adharganj, Dalippur, Partabgarh District, United Provinces
Chaudhri Brij Raj Saran Singh, President, Sahanpur Recruiting Depot, Bulandshahr District, United Provinces
Chaudhri Dhiri Singh, late Honorary District Assistant Recruiting Officer, Mainpuri District, United Provinces
Honorary Ressaidar Chaudhri Nihal Singh, of Bijnor, United Provinces
Bhai Gurbakhsh Singh, Executive Engineer, Public Works Department, Buildings and Roads Branch, Lahore, Punjab
Subardar-Maj. and Honorary Capt. Hira Singh, Sardar Bahadur, Aide-de-Camp to His Honour the Lieutenant-Governor, Bihar and Orissa
Rai Bahadur Bhai Lehna Singh, Provincial Civil Service, District Judge, Dera Ismail Khan, North-West Frontier Province
Mary Sladen, Red Cross Associations, Muttra and Bareily, United Provinces
Alexander Frederick Slater, Superintendent, Postal Workshops and Piess, Aligarh, United Provinces of Agra and Oudh
Una Soames, Red Cross Association, Darrang, Assam
Gertrude Stephenson, Red Cross and Comforts for the Troops Funds, Laiore, Punjab
Thomas Smith Sterling, Professor, Presidency College, Calcutta, Bengal
Lenna Mary Stratford, Chief Inspectress of Schools, Punjab
Anne Smith Tait, Red Cross Association, Mysore State
Mary Thaddeus, War Depot, Calcutta, Bengal
Mary Powney Thompson, Red Cross and Comforts for the Troops Funds, Multan Division, Punjab
Edith Tonkinson, Honorary Secretary, Burma Labour Corps Comforts Fund and the Sagaing Red Cross Branch, Burma
Lucia Turnbull, Voluntary War Worker, Bombay
Constance Henry Turner, War Clothing, and Comforts for the Troops Fund, Harbanswala Tea Estate, Dehra Dun, United Provinces
Rao Sahib Govind Mahadeo Vaidya, Assistant Controller of War Accounts
Edith Mary Vanes, in charge of the Wesleyan Soldiers Home and Club, Bangalore Mysore State
Ardeshir Dosabhai Wadia, Bombay
Hellen Stuart Waller-Senior, Red Cross Association, Mysore, Mysore State
Margaret Jean Walter, Comforts for the Troops Fund, Dehra Dun
Winifred Edith Walter, Lady Superintendent, Nursing Staff of Civil Hospital, Karachi, Sind, Bombay
Edith Way, Secretary, Red Cross Association, Naini Tal, United Provinces
Ida Willmore, Secretary of the Sind Women's Branch of the Imperial War Relief Fund, Sind, Bombay
John Hughes Wilson  Superintendent, Arrakan Commissioners Office, Burma
Norah Woodall, Red Cross Depot, Peshawar, North-West Frontier Province

Dominion of New Zealand
Alfred Montague Adams, for services as Chief Executive Officer of the Munitions and Supplies Department
Rachel Mary Barton, for services in connection with patriotic organisations
Margaret Brown Blackwell, for services in connection with the Countess of Liverpool Fund for the New Zealand Expeditionary Force
Hilda Bloonifield, for services in connection with the New Zealand Branch of the British Red Cross Society and the Order of St. John of Jerusalem and for the Victoria League
Annie Elizabeth Blundell, for services in connection with the New Zealand Branch of the British Red Cross Society and Order of St. John of Jerusalem
Janet Bowie, for Red Cross services
Violet McConochie Brown, for services in connection with soldiers' equipment
Charles Hay ward Burgess, Mayor of New Plymouth, for patriotic services
Alexander Burt, Junior, for services in connection with the Motor Boat Section of the New Zealand Defence Forces
Edith de Castro, for services in institutions at Cairo and in Canteen at Ismailia, Egypt
Esther Charles, for patriotic services
Lydia Clark, for services in connection with the Countess of Liverpool Fund for the New Zealand Expeditionary Force
Ethel Mary Cooper, for services in connection with the New Zealand Branch of the British Red Cross Society and the Order of St. John
Frances Zoe Courage, for services in connection with the New Zealand Branch of the British Red Cross Society and the Order of St. John of Jerusalem
Gertrude Alice Crawford, for services in connection with the Countess of Liverpool Fund for the New Zealand Expeditionary Force
Ethel Cuff, for services in connection with the New Zealand Branch of the British Red Cross Society and the Order of St. John of Jerusalem
Hannah Dawson, for patriotic services
George Finley Dixon, for services as Private Secretary to the Minister of Defence
Mabel Ellison, for service in connection with the New Zealand Branch of the British Red Cross Society and the Order of St. John of Jerusalem
Harold Gerard, for services as Assistant Private Secretary to the Minister of Defence
Louisa Grace Charlotte Greenslade, for patriotic services
Thomas Gunnion, for patriotic services
Brenda Guthrie, for services as a voluntary worker at the Victoria Military Ward of the Wellington Hospital
Eveline Alice Marian Harcourt, for services on the voluntary staff at Base Records Office, New Zealand
Kate Harrison, for patriotic services
Henry William Harrington, for services as Censor
Heathcote George Helmore, for services as Aide-de-Camp to the Governor-General of New Zealand
Emma Carey Hill, for services in connection with the Victoria League
Margaret Mary Annie Hislop, for services in connection with the Countess of Liverpool Fund
Ann Margaret Kitchen, for services in connection with Belgian Relief and the entertainment of New Zealand soldiers
Elizabeth Annie Holdsworth, for services on the voluntary staff at Base Records Office, New Zealand
William Godfrey Holdsworth, for services on the voluntary staff at Base Records Office, New Zealand
Lavinia Jano Kelsey, for patriotic services
Emma Ethel Maud Ford King, for patriotic services
Sarah Hannah King, for patriotic services
James Lovell for services in connection with Patriotic Funds
Ethel Constance Chapman Macassey, for patriotic services
Mina MacDonald, for services at the Aotea Home, Heliopolis, Cairo, Egypt
Mysie McDonnell, for services at the Aotea Home, Heliopolis, Cairo, Egypt
Agnes McDougall, for services in connection with patriotic undertakings
Pura McGregor, for services in connection with the Maori Expeditionary Force
Nesta Gertrude Maling, for services in connection with the Countess of Liverpool Fund for the New Zealand Expeditionary Force
Basil Arthur Marris, for services as Chief Clerk, Base Records Office, New Zealand
Alfred Andrew Martin, for services in organising supply of motor vehicles at Auckland for returning soldiers
Lieutenant Frederick Gwilliam Matthews, for services as Private Secretary to the Minister of Defence
James Dothie Millton, for services in connection with the Citizens' Defence Corps
Winnifred Moeller, for patriotic services
Janet Murray, for services in connection with the New Zealand Branch of the British Red Cross Society and the Order of St. John of Jerusalem
Leo Francis O'Neill, for services in the Chief of the General Staff's Branch of the Defence Department
Jessie Ellen Page, for services in supplying comforts to the soldiers at Featherston Military Training Camp
Lucy Philson, for patriotic services
Mary Ann Potter, for services in connection with the Red Cross and the Countess of Liverpool Fund
George Charles Rodda, for services as Officer in charge of War expenses Branch of the Defence Department
William Archibald Russell, for services in connection with patriotic undertakings
George Herbert Scales, for services in shipping matters, and other patriotic work
Annie Wilhelmina Smart, for services in connection with patriotic undertakings
Lilly Mary Smith, for services in connection with the New Zealand Branch of the British Red Cross Society and the Order of St. John of Jerusalem
Martha Spencer, for services in connection with the Maori Expeditionary Force
Florence Johanna Stevenson, for work for the New Zealand Branch of the British Red Cross Society and the Order of St. John of Jerusalem
Bernard Tripp, for work for the New Zealand Branch of the British Red Cross Society and the- Order of St. John of Jerusalem
Charles James Tunks, for services to the St. John Ambulance Association
James Alfred Wallace, for Red Cross and other patriotic services
Elsmie Ward, for services on the voluntary staff at Base Records Office, New Zealand
Charles White, for services in connection with patriotic funds
Cecil James Wray, for services in connection with Prisoners of War and the comfort of New Zealand troops in hospitals in the United Kingdom
Elten Wray, for services in connection with New Zealand prisoners of war
Mrs. F. R. Young, for services in connection with the New Zealand War Contingent Association, London

Union of South Africa
Julia Ada Anderson, Secretary to Queen Mary's Needlework Guild, Pretoria
Agnes McWhirter Appelyard, Member of the Johannesburg Local Committee of the Governor-General's Fund
Julia Constance Addie, for general war services at Witbank
Charles William Black, Senior, for services in connection with war recruiting and the welfare of returned soldiers at Mossel Bay
Mary Ann Champion, for general war services, Boksburg
Norris Tynwald Cowin, for services in connection with recruiting
Jean Conchie, for general war work and supply of comforts for returned soldiers, Braamfontein
Alfred Edward Catchpole, for services in connection with the South African Red Cross in London
Robert Edward Downing, for services in connection with the Governor-General's Fund in East London
Caroline Elizabeth Grattan Edgar, for general war services, Stellenbosch
Sydney York Bales, Secretary to the Commissioner of Enemy subjects and Custodian of enemy property
Amy Anderson Fisher, Honorary Treasurer, Non-Contingent Committee of the South African Hospital and Comforts Fund, &c
Robert Wilson Fair, Officer in Charge of exports
Mathilde Field, for general war services at Oudtshoorn
Dorothy Eleanor Garlake, for Red Cross services at Cradock
Lilian Napier Giddy, for general war services at Grahamstown
Catherine Ramsay Laburn Grieve, for general war services at Braamfontein
Lena Herman, Mayoress of Pietersburg, for general war sendees
Helen Edith Howard, for general war services at Barberton
Lancelot Hugh Dowman Hale, Honorary Secretary, Governor-General's Fund and Returned Soldiers' Labour Bureau, Middelburg, Transvaal
Christine Louise Herbert-Smith, of the South African Comforts Committee in London
Edward Wykeham Lydall, for work in supervising accounts for internment camps and relief of distress expenditure
John George Laing, for general war services at Elliott
Donald Arderne McIntyre, Honorary Secretary of the Royal Automobile Club of South Africa
2nd Lt. Leonard Bertram Naggs, Officer in charge of Comforts Committee, Overseas depot of South African Hospital and Comforts Fund
George Frederick MacDonogh, South African Railways Agent, Lourengo Marques
Thomas Maskew Miller, for general war services
Harrison Ralph Nethersole, Director, Chamber of Mines Central Buying Department
William Nivison, Honorary Treasurer, Governor-General's Fund
Capt. Charles Paul Leonard Nel, for services in connection with recruiting; Secretary, Returning Soldiers' Committee, Oudtshoorn
Constance Perrott Prince, Honorary Assistant Secretary, Red Cross, Durban
Hannah Mary Poritt, for general war services at Grey Town
Samuel Redhill, Honorary Secretary, Governor-General's Fund, Springs
Dorothy Heyward Rogers, Honorary Secretary, Non-Contingent Committee of the South African Hospital and Comforts Funds
Fergus Carstairs Rogers, for services in connection with recruiting
Maj. Alfred Ernest Trigger, Assistant Provost Marshal
Lilian Elizabeth Tatham, for general war work at Grey Town
Minnie Elena Scott Taylor, Quartermaster at the Voluntary Aid Detachment Hospice, Congella
George Batching Thompson, for general war services, Pondoland
The Rev. Harry Ernest Thompson, Secretary of the Governor-General's Fund Committee, Bloemfontein
Gilbert Watson, Member of the Central Wool Committee, Port Elizabeth
Margaret Janet Wallace, Matron of the Voluntary Aid Detachment Hospice, Congella
Erne Way, for general war services at Grahamstown

Newfoundland
Charles Pascoe Ayre, for services in connection with the Women's Patriotic Association
Alfred Charles Blackburn, for patriotic work
Agnes Clift, for services in connection with the Women's Patriotic Association
Mildred Clift, for services in connection with the Women's Patriotic Association
Lillian Maud Facey, for services on behalf of the Women's Patriotic Association
Janet Aitken Fisher, for services on behalf of the Women's Patriotic Association
Henry Frederick Fitzgerald, for services in connection with recruiting
Ethel Harvey, for Red Cross services
Emily Hannah Hollands, for services in connection with the Women's Patriotic Association
Henrietta Palfrey Holloway, for services in collecting and preparing Spagnum Moss
Reuben Horwood, for patriotic services
Helen Kennedy, for services in connection with the Women's Patriotic Association
Elizabeth Shaw Lauder, for services on behalf of the Women's Patriotic Association
Flora Emma McDonald, for services on behalf of the Women's Patriotic Association
Richard McDonnell, Magistrate of Bay St. George, for services in connection with Pensions and other matters
Margaret McPherson, President of the Daughters of the Empire and one of the Reception Committee for Soldiers
George Frederick Moore, Treasurer of the Patriotic Fund at Heart's Content
Eliza Petten, for services in connection with the Women's Patriotic Association
John Alexander Robinson  Postmaster-General; for patriotic services
Organiser of the Tobacco Fund for the Newfoundland Regiment
Carolina Augusta Somerton, President of the Committee of the Women's Patriotic Association at Trinity
Charles Robert Steer, for services in raising funds for aeroplanes
Ernest Swaffield, for patriotic work, Labrador
Sarah Ann Thompson, for services on behalf of the Women's Patriotic Association
Effie Morris Tulk, for services on behalf of the Women's Patriotic Association

Crown Colonies, Protectorates, Etc.
Ina Cameron Ainsworth, for services on behalf of the East Africa Expeditionary Force
Dorothea Anne Harvey Aldworth of Kuala Lumpur, for services on behalf of British and Allied War Charities in the Federated Malay States
Hubert Arrnbruster, District Resident, First Grade, Nyasaland Protectorate, for services in connection with the recruitment of carriers and the supply of native foodstuffs
Edgar Arrigo, Deputy Assistant Secretary, Lieutenant Governor's Office, Malta
Captain Francis John Bagshawe, Assistant Political Officer, Mbulu, German East Africa
Blanche Bancroft, for war work in Barbados
William Bartley, for services as Secretary to the Food Control, Shipping and other Committees, Straits Settlements
Charles Frederick Belcher, Magistrate, Uganda Protectorate, for sendees as Custodian of enemy property
Agnes Bennett, of Umtali, Rhodesia, for services in connection with war funds
Albert Victor Bernard  for services in connection with hospital and nursing work in Malta
Maud Bettington, for services in connection with hospital work, Gold Coast
Robert William Bryant, Mayor of Kingston, Jamaica, for general war work
Augusta Margaret Bucknor, for services in aid of the Gold Coast Red Coast Fund
James Arthur Edward Bullock, Chief Clerk, Colonial Secretary's Department, Hong Kong
John James Bushell, services in connection with the Red Cross, Bermuda
Lewis Borg Cardona, for services as Secretary to the Supplies and Prices Board and the Wheat Board, Malta
Henry Casolani, for services in connection with the importation of foodstuffs into Malta
Louise Chataway, of Umtali, Rhodesia, for services in connection with war funds
Albert Henry Cipriani, Member of the Liquidating Committee for winding-up alien enemy businesses in Trinidad
Percival Herbert Clarke, Unofficial Member of the Legislative Council, East Africa Protectorate, for services on behalf of the British Red Cross Society and Order of St. John
Marie Penelope Rose Clementi, for services in connection with Queen Mary's Needlework Guild in British Guiana
Ada Blanche Pierce Conyers, for services in connection with Queen Mary's Needlework Guild in British Guiana
Percy Charles Cookson, Magistrate, Northern Rhodesia, for services in connection with native carriers
Edward Arden Copeman, Magistrate, Northern Rhodesia, for services in connection with native carriers
Manuel Gregory Corsi, for services as Member of the Food Supply Committee, Gibraltar
Alexander Percy Cowley, Chairman of the Agricultural and Commercial Society of Antigua, for services in connection with war charities
Attilio Critien  for medical services during the war, Malta
Edmund Clarke de Fonseka, for services in support of war charities in Ceylon
Dora Florence De Freitas, for Red Cross and other war work, Windward Islands
Mary Margaret de Soyse, for services in connection with, war charities in Ceylon
Florence Grace Drew, for services in connection with Red Cross funds, Northern Rhodesia
Maude Ellefred Evans for general war work, Gibraltar
Beaumont Albany Fetherstone-Dilke  Assistant Surgeon, Colonial Hospital, Gibraltar
Alfred E. Ffrench, for services in connection with Red Cross work and recruiting, Jamaica
Violet Amy Flint, for services on behalf of the East Africa Expeditionary Force
Elfrida Fuller, for hospital work in Ashanti
Joseph Gatt-Rutter, Chief Clerk, Secretariat, German East Africa
Gladys Gordon, for Red Cross and other charitable work in Ceylon
Charles William Gregory, Chief Storekeeper, Public Works Department, East Africa Protectorate, acted as Food Controller at Mombasa
Lieutenant Alexander Greig, Assistant Political Officer, German East Africa
Joseph Ephraim Casely Hayford, Barrister-at-Law, for services in aid of the Prince of Wales's Patriotic Fund, Gold Coast
Josephine Norie Henocksburg, for work in connection with the Women's War Work League, East Africa Protectorate
James Henry Hewett, Chief Prisons Officer, Zanzibar Protectorate, for services in connection with local defence and the custody of prisoners of war
Frances Patton Heyman, of Bulawayo, Rhodesia, for services in connection with war funds
Alice Hickling, for services as Secretary, Queen Mary's Needlework Guild, Hong Kong
Ernest Augustis Hinkson, for war work in Barbados in connection with the Police Force
Alice Mary Hobley, for work on behalf of the East Africa Expeditionary Force
Dorothy Hobson, for services in connection with the Red Cross and other war funds, Trinidad
Anthony Hodgson, for services to the Cable Censor's Department, Gibraltar
Anne Huyshe Eliot, for services in connection with war charities in Ceylon
Sybil Ingham, of Gwelo, Rhodesia, for services in connection with war funds
Hubert Lawrence Johnson, for services as Chief Passport Examiner, Barbados
Herbert Lewis Lezard, ex-Mayor of Salisbury, Rhodesia, for services in connection with war funds
Hilda Charlotte Long, for services in con.nection with war funds, Basutoland
George Lyall, First Assistant Secretary, Uganda Protectorate
Sydney Cameron McCutchin, for services in connection with recruiting, Jamaica
James Colin Macintyre, Member of the Executive and Legislative Councils, Dominica, for services in connection with recruiting and war charities
Mary McKeartan, of Bulawayo, Rhodesia, for services in connection with war funds
Annie Mackie, for Red Cross and other charitable work, Windward Islands
Henry Peter Marius McLaughlan, Chief Clerk, Chief Secretary's Office, Cyprus, for services in connection with the purchase of supplies
Albert Merriefield, Assistant Engineer, Public Works Department, Cyprus, for services in connection with the Prisoners of War Camp, Famagusta
Horace Myers, of Kingston, Jamaica, for services to contingents from the Bahama Islands
Ruth Ethel Paul, for services in connection with war funds, Bechuanaland Protectorate
Mary Percival for services in connection with war charities in Antigua
Mary Perez, for services in connection with war funds and charities, Trinidad
Percy Wilbraham Perryman, District Commissioner, Uganda Protectorate, for services in connection with the organisation of transport and food supplies
Emily Phillips, for war work in Barbados
Captain Charles Peniston Pitt, Bermuda Volunteer Rifle Corps, Assistant Provost Marshal, Bermuda
Captain George Arthur Evered Poole, for services as District Political Officer at Yendi, Upper Togoland
Anna Pordage, for services as Nurse-Matron of the Victoria Hospital, St. Lucia
John Rutherfoord Parkin Postlethwaite, Assistant District Commissioner, Uganda Protectorate, for assistance in recruiting
Thomas Frederick Sandford, Native Commissioner, Northern Rhodesia, for services in connection with native carriers
Emilïe Scanlen, of Salisbury, Rhodesia, for services in connection with war funds
Blanche Shearman-Turner, for services in connection with the Convalescent Home for Officers, Zanzibar
Montague Earle Sherwood, for services as Private Secretary and Aide-de-Camp to the Governor and Commander-in-Chief of the Straits Settlements
Ether Stabb, for services as President, Queen Mary's Needlework Guild, Hong Kong
Robert Sutherland, for services in connection with Shipping control, Hong Kong
Elizabeth Sweenie, for services on behalf of the East Africa Expeditionary Force
Dieudonnée Grace Thorburn, for services on behalf of the Nyasaland Field Force
Helen Tredgold, of Salisbury, Rhodesia, for work on behalf of Rhodesian soldiers at Cape Town
Nora Cecilia Tywnam, for work for Queen Mary's Needlework Guild in Ceylon
Abdulrasul Allidina Visram, for services on behalf of the British Red Cross Society and the Order of St. John of Jerusalem, East Africa Protectorate
Claude Dudley Wallis, First Assistant Secretary, Zanzibar Protectorate
Howard Grove Warr, Secretary to the Colonial Hospital, Gibraltar
Gwendoline Isabel Watson, for services on behalf of the East Africa Expeditionary Force
Margaret Jane Watson, of Umtali, Rhodesia, for services in connection with war funds
Josephine Westmorland, for services in connection with Red Cross work and recruiting, Jamaica
Mabel White, of Gwelo, Rhodesia, for services in connection with war funds
Francis Williamson, Secretary, Tati Company, for services in connection with war funds, Bechuanaland Protectorate
Edward Jocelyn Wortley, Director of Agriculture, Bermuda, for services in connection with food supplies
George Macdonald Young, for services in connection with Shipping Control, Hong Kong

Honorary Members
Sheikh Burhan bin Abdul Aziz, Kathi, Zanzibar
Seyyid Serhan bin Nasur, Liwali, Zanzibar

See also
1919 Birthday Honours - Full list of awards.

References

Birthday Honours
1919 awards
1919 in Australia
1919 in Canada
1919 in India
1919 in New Zealand
1919 in the United Kingdom